= Donald P. Eckman Award =

The Donald P. Eckman Award is an award given by the American Automatic Control Council recognizing outstanding achievements by a young researcher under the age of 35 in the field of control theory. Together with the Richard E. Bellman Control Heritage Award, the Eckman Award is one of the most prestigious awards in control theory.

== Recipients ==
- 1964: Michael Athans
- 1965: John Bollinger
- 1966: Roger Bakke
- 1967: Roger W. Brockett
- 1968: Robert E. Larson
- 1969: W. Harmon Ray
- 1970: John Seinfeld
- 1971: Raman Mehra
- 1972: Cecil L. Smith
- 1973: Edison Tse
- 1974: Timothy L. Johnson
- 1975: Alan S. Willsky
- 1976: Robert W. Atherton
- 1977: Nils R. Sandell, Jr.
- 1978: Narendra K. Gupta
- 1979: Joe Hong Chow
- 1980: Manfred Morari
- 1981: Rajan Suri
- 1982: Bruce Hajek
- 1983: John C. Doyle
- 1984: Mark A. Shayman
- 1985: P.R. Kumar
- 1986: Yaman Arkun
- 1987: Rahmatallah Shoureshi
- 1988: Bijoy K. Ghosh
- 1989: Pramod P. Khargonekar
- 1990: Shankar S. Sastry
- 1991: Carl N. Nett
- 1992: Stephen P. Boyd
- 1993: Munther A. Dahleh
- 1994: Kameshwar Poolla
- 1995: Andrew Packard
- 1996: Jeff S. Shamma
- 1997: Richard M. Murray
- 1998: Ioannis Kanellakopoulos
- 1999: Andrew R. Teel
- 2000: Richard D. Braatz
- 2001: Dawn M. Tilbury
- 2002: Ilya Kolmanovsky
- 2003: Claire J. Tomlin
- 2004: Panagiotis D. Christofides
- 2005: Pablo A. Parrilo
- 2006: Murat Arcak
- 2007: Daniel Liberzon
- 2008: Asuman Özdağlar
- 2009: Paulo Tabuada
- 2010: Domitilla Del Vecchio
- 2011: Hana El-Samad
- 2012: Jason Marden
- 2013: Vijay Gupta
- 2014: Hamsa Balakrishnan
- 2015: Aaron D. Ames
- 2016: Javad Lavaei
- 2017: Ketan Savla
- 2018: Behrouz Touri
- 2019: Na (Lina) Li
- 2020: Samuel Coogan
- 2021: Xudong Chen
- 2022: Yongxin Chen
- 2023: Jorge I. Poveda
- 2024: Mengdi Wang
- 2025: Yang Zheng
- 2026: Kaiqing Zhang

== See also ==
- List of engineering awards
