= Na Li =

Chinese-American control theorist

Na (Lina) Li (Chinese: 黎娜) is a Chinese and American electrical engineer and applied mathematician, the Winokur Family Professor of Electrical Engineering and Applied Mathematics in the Harvard John A. Paulson School of Engineering and Applied Sciences at Harvard University. Her research involves control theory, especially as applied to power networks and cyber-physical systems.

== Education and career ==
Li received a bachelor's degree in mathematics and applied mathematics in 2007 from Zhejiang University, also including studies as a visiting student in mechanical and aerospace engineering at the University of California, Los Angeles, and learned about control theory there through work with Jeff S. Shamma. She contintued her studies in control and dynamical systems at the California Institute of Technology, where she completed her Ph.D. in 2013. Her dissertation, Distributed optimization in power networks and general multi-agent systems, was jointly advised by John Doyle and Steven H. Low.

After postdoctoral research at the Massachusetts Institute of Technology, she became an assistant professor of electrical engineering and applied mathematics at Harvard in 2014. She was named as Thomas D. Cabot Associate Professor in 2018, Gordon McKay Professor in 2020, and Winokur Family Professor in 2023. She has also been associated with two startup companies, Singularity Energy Inc. and Elastro Inc.

== Recognition ==
Li was the 2019 recipient of the Donald P. Eckman Award of the American Automatic Control Council. From 2020 to 2023 she was a Pavel J. Nowacki Distinguished Lecturer of the International Federation of Automatic Control (IFAC), and she was the 2023 recipient of IFAC's Manfred Thoma Medal. The IEEE Control Systems Society gave her their 2024 Antonio Ruberti Young Researcher Prize, "for fundamental contributions to control, learning, and optimization of cyber-physical systems and application to biomedical and energy systems", and she was named to the 2026 class of IEEE Fellows, "for contributions to control, learning, and optimization and applications to energy and biomedical systems".
