= John R. Ragazzini Award =

Award for education in automatic control

The John R. Ragazzini Education Award is an annual award presented by the American Automatic Control Council (AACC) for contributions to education in automatic control. It is named after John R. Ragazzini, who was the first recipient in 1979.

Recipients must have spent a significant part of their careers in the United States. Contributions recognized by the award include classroom teaching, textbook development, and student mentoring, as well as research in engineering education and the development of online courses.

== Recipients ==
The following recipients are listed by the AACC.

- 1979: John R. Ragazzini
- 1980: Michael Athans
- 1981: Yasundo Takahashi
- 1982: Arthur E. Bryson
- 1983: Charles A. Desoer
- 1984: H. M. Paynter
- 1985: Gene F. Franklin
- 1986: Thomas Kailath
- 1987: George J. Thaler
- 1988: Wallace E. Vander Velde
- 1989: W. Harmon Ray
- 1990: Kumpati S. Narendra
- 1991: Michael J. Rabins
- 1992: Thomas F. Edgar
- 1993: Dale E. Seborg
- 1995: J. Boyd Pearson
- 1996: David M. Auslander
- 1997: William R. Perkins
- 1998: Peter Dorato
- 1999: Katsuhiko Ogata
- 2000: Hassan K. Khalil
- 2001: Dimitri P. Bertsekas
- 2002: Robert F. Stengel
- 2003: Stephen P. Boyd
- 2004: Mark W. Spong
- 2005: S. Shankar Sastry
- 2006: Masayoshi Tomizuka
- 2007: Manfred Morari
- 2008: Stephen Yurkovich
- 2009: George Stephanopoulos
- 2010: Tzyh Jong Tarn
- 2011: James B. Rawlings
- 2013: Mathukumalli Vidyasagar
- 2014: Roger W. Brockett
- 2015: Magnus Egerstedt
- 2016: Brian D. O. Anderson
- 2017: Miroslav Krstić
- 2018: Frank L. Lewis
- 2019: Richard M. Murray
- 2020: Naomi Leonard
- 2021: Graham Goodwin
- 2022: Bonnie Ferri
- 2023: Richard D. Braatz
- 2024: John D. Hedengren
- 2025: Dawn Tilbury
- 2026: Dennis S. Bernstein

== See also ==
- List of people in systems and control
- List of engineering awards
- List of education awards
