= Richard D. Braatz =

American chemical engineer (born 1966)

- Born: July 19, 1966 (age 60)
- Education: Oregon State University; Caltech
- Awards: Donald P. Eckman Award; Antonio Ruberti Young Researcher Prize; Hertz Foundation; National Academy of Engineering
- Scientific career
- Fields: Control theory
- Workplaces: Massachusetts Institute of Technology
- Doctoral advisor: Manfred Morari

Richard D. Braatz (born July 19, 1966) is the Edwin R. Gilliland Professor at the Massachusetts Institute of Technology known for his research in control theory and its applications to chemical, pharmaceutical, and materials systems.

He has received many honors, including the Hertz Foundation Thesis Prize, the Donald P. Eckman Award and John R. Ragazzini Award from the American Automatic Control Council, the Curtis W. McGraw Research Award from the Engineering Research Council, the Antonio Ruberti Young Researcher Prize from the Antonio Ruberti Foundation and IEEE Control Systems Society "For theoretical results in the robust control of complex systems, and their application in the process, pharmaceutical, and microelectronics industries" in 2005, and the IEEE CSS Transition to Practice Award. Braatz was elected to the National Academy of Engineering in 2019. He is a Fellow of the International Federation of Automatic Control, the Institute of Electrical and Electronics Engineers, and the American Association for the Advancement of Science.

== Biography ==
Braatz graduated from Oregon State University with a B.S. in 1988 with an undergraduate thesis on heat exchanger design supervised by Octave Levenspiel. He worked at Chevron Research before receiving his M.S. and Ph.D. in robust control from the California Institute of Technology under the direction of Professor Manfred Morari. His thesis included a proof that robust control problems are NP-hard. After a postdoctoral year at DuPont, he moved to the University of Illinois at Urbana-Champaign, where he rose to the position of Millennium Chair and Professor, with positions in chemical and biomolecular engineering, electrical and computer engineering, mechanical science and engineering, bioengineering, applied mathematics, and computational science and engineering. After serving as a visiting scholar for a year at Harvard University, in 2010 he moved to MIT's Department of Chemical Engineering, where he continues research in systems and control theory and its applications.

Braatz has made contributions in the areas of robust optimal control, fault detection and diagnosis, sheet and film processes, crystallization, lithium-ion batteries, and pharmaceutical manufacturing.

== Sources ==
- Richard Braatz Faculty Page
- Donald P. Eckman Award
- John R. Ragazzini Award
- Antonio Ruberti Young Researcher Prize
- IEEE Control Systems Society Transition to Practice Award
- Curtis W. McGraw Research Award
- Hertz Foundation Thesis Prize
- AACC Executive Officers
- National Academy of Engineering
