= Mark W. Spong =

American roboticist (born 1952)

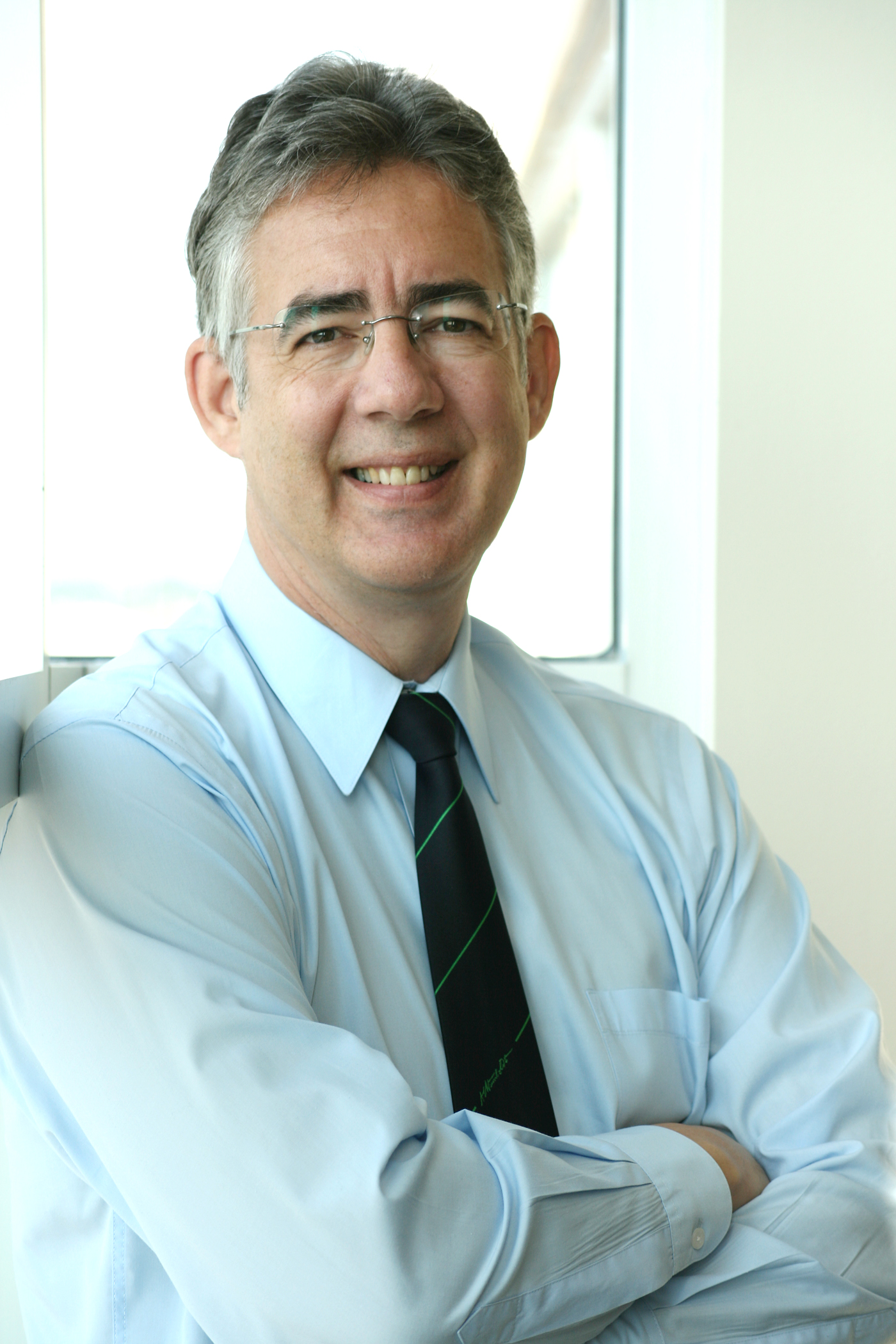
- Born: November 5, 1952 (age 73); Warren, Ohio
- Education: Washington University in St. Louis; New Mexico State University; Hiram College
- Scientific career
- Fields: Robotics; Control theory
- Workplaces: University of Texas at Dallas; University of Illinois at Urbana-Champaign
- Doctoral advisor: T.J. Tarn

Mark W. Spong (born November 5, 1952, in Warren, Ohio) is an American roboticist. He is a professor of systems engineering and electrical and computer engineering in the Erik Jonsson School of Engineering & Computer Science at the University of Texas at Dallas (UTD). He served as dean of the Jonsson School and the Lars Magnus Ericsson Chair in Electrical Engineering from 2008 to 2017. Before he joined UTD, he was the Donald Biggar Willett Professor of Engineering, professor of electrical engineering, research professor of Coordinated Science Laboratory and Information Trust Institute, and director of Center for Autonomous Engineering Systems and Robotics at the University of Illinois at Urbana-Champaign.

Spong is a Life Fellow of the Institute of Electrical and Electronics Engineers (IEEE). He has received numerous awards for his research and teaching, including

- the 2025 IFAC TC on Robotics Lifetime Achievement Award
- the 2020 Rufus Oldenburger Medal from the American Society of Mechanical Engineers
- the 2018 Bode Lecture Prize from the IEEE Control Systems Society
- the 2016 Nyquist Lecture Prize from the Dynamical Systems and Control Division of the ASME
- the 2007 IROS Fumio Harashima Award for Innovative Technologies
- the O. Hugo Schuck Award in 2002 and 2009 from the American Automatic Control Council
- the 2004 John R. Ragazzini Award from the American Automatic Control Council
- the IEEE Third Millennium Medal.

Spong received his B.A. in mathematics and physics from Hiram College in 1975, a M.S. in mathematics from New Mexico State University in 1977, and a M.S. and D.Sc. in systems science and mathematics from Washington University in St. Louis in 1979 and 1981, respectively.

== Books ==
- 1989. Robot Dynamics and Control. with M. Vidyasagar
- 1993. Robot Control : Dynamics, Motion Planning, and Analysis with F.L. Lewis and C.T. Abdallah (ed.)
- 2006. Robot Modeling and Control. with S. Hutchinson and M. Vidyasagar
- 2007. The Reaction Wheel Pendulum, with D. J. Block and K. J. Astrom
- 2015. Passivity-Based Control in Networked Robotics, with Takeshi Hatanaka, Nikhil Chopra, and Masayuki Fujita
- 2022. Robot Modeling and Control, Second Edition, with S. Hutchinson and M. Vidyasagar
- 2024. Introduction to Modeling and Simulation: A Systems Approach
- 2025. A First Course in Complex Networks
