= Stephen Yurkovich =

Stephen Yurkovich is a Fellow of the IEEE, and holds the Louis Beecherl Jr. Distinguished Chair in Engineering at the University of Texas at Dallas, United States, where he is also Program Head of Systems Engineering. Until early 2011, he held a joint appointment as Professor of Electrical and Computer Engineering, and Mechanical Engineering, at The Ohio State University, where he was also Director of the Honda-OSU Partnership Program in which he oversaw endowments of over $40M. Also at Ohio State, he served as Acting Director of the Center for Automotive Research in 2007.

Professor Yurkovich’s research, published in more than 200 books, journal articles and conference papers, includes work in the areas of system identification and parameter set estimation for control, nonlinear and adaptive control, and fuzzy logic for control, in application areas including automotive systems, aerospace systems, chemical process control, welding processes, and flexible mechanical structures.

== Awards and honors ==
- 2012: Elected to Institute of Electrical and Electronics Engineers (IEEE) Board of Directors, Division X
- 2008: John R. Ragazzini Award in Control Education from the American Automatic Control Council
- 2001: Fellow of Institute of Electrical and Electronics Engineers (IEEE).
- 2000: IEEE Control Systems Society Distinguished Member Award.
- 2000: Institute of Electrical and Electronics Engineers (IEEE) Millennium Medal recipient.
