= Kosecki =

Kosecki and its feminine form Kosecka are Slavic surnames. Notable people with the surname include:

- Jakub Kosecki (born 1990), Polish footballer
- Jana Košecká, Slovak-American computer scientist
- Roman Kosecki (born 1966), Polish footballer
