= Shankar Sastry =

Indian academic

S. Shankar Sastry
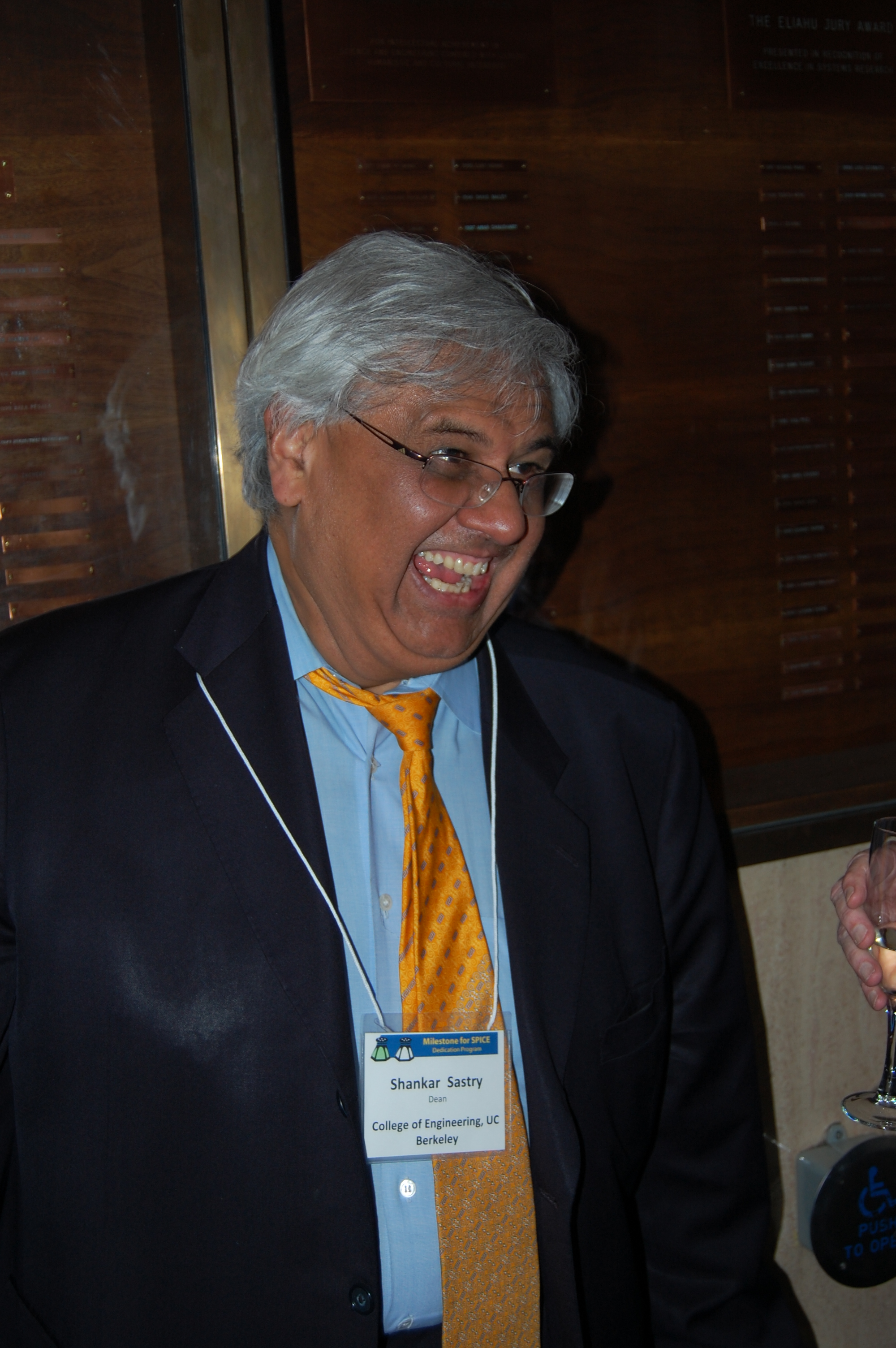
- Education: IIT Bombay; University of California, Berkeley
- Spouse: Claire J. Tomlin
- Awards: Donald P. Eckman Award
- Scientific career
- Fields: Robotics; Control theory
- Workplaces: University of California, Berkeley, Plaksha University, MIT, Harvard University
- Thesis: Jump Behavior of Circuits and Systems
- Doctoral advisor: Charles Auguste Desoer
- Doctoral students: Stephen P. Boyd; Linda Bushnell; Yi Ma; Dawn Tilbury; Claire J. Tomlin; René Vidal

S. Shankar Sastry is the founding chancellor of the Plaksha University, Mohali and a former Dean of Engineering at the University of California, Berkeley.

From 1996-1999, he was the director of the Electronics Research Laboratory at Berkeley. From 1999-early 2001, he was on leave from Berkeley as director of the Information Technology Office at the Defense Advanced Research Projects Agency (DARPA). He has served as chairman, Department of Electrical Engineering and Computer Sciences, University of California, Berkeley from January, 2001 through June 2004. From 2004 to 2007 he was the director of CITRIS (Center for Information Technology in the Interest of Society) an interdisciplinary center spanning UC Berkeley, Davis, Merced and Santa Cruz.

He is currently a professor of Electrical Engineering and Computer Science, a professor of Bioengineering, and faculty director of the Blum Center for Developing Economies at UC Berkeley.

== Biography ==
Sastry obtained bachelor's degree from Indian Institute of Technology Bombay (1977) and Master's and PhD degrees from University of California, Berkeley (1979, 1980, 1981). His PhD advisor was Charles Desoer. He was on the faculty of MIT as Asst. Professor from 1980–82 and Harvard University as a chaired Gordon Mc Kay professor in 1994. He is married to his former PhD student Claire J. Tomlin, who currently holds a joint appointment as an associate professor in the Department of Aeronautics and Astronautics and the Department of Electrical Engineering, at Stanford University, where she is director of the Hybrid Systems Laboratory and as an associate professor in the Department of Electrical Engineering and Computer Science at University of California, Berkeley.

His areas of personal research are resilient network control systems, cybersecurity, autonomous and unmanned systems (especially aerial vehicles), computer vision, nonlinear and adaptive control, control of hybrid and embedded systems, and software. Most recently he has been concerned with critical infrastructure protection, in the context of establishing a ten-year NSF Science and Technology Center, TRUST (Team for Research in Ubiquitous Secure Technologies).

He has coauthored over 600 technical papers and 10 books, including Adaptive Control: Stability, Convergence and Robustness (with M. Bodson, Prentice Hall, 1989), A Mathematical Introduction to Robotic Manipulation (with R. Murray and Z. Li, CRC Press, 1994), Nonlinear Systems: Analysis, Stability and Control (Springer-Verlag, 1999), An Invitation to 3D Vision: From Images to Models (Springer Verlag, 2003) (with Yi Ma, Stefano Soatto, and Jana Košecká), and Generalized Principal Component Analysis (Springer, 2016) (with René Vidal and Yi Ma). Sastry served as associate editor for numerous publications, including: IEEE Transactions on Automatic Control; IEEE Control Magazine; IEEE Transactions on Circuits and Systems; the Journal of Mathematical Systems, Estimation and Control; IMA Journal of Control and Information; the International Journal of Adaptive Control and Signal Processing; Journal of Biomimetic Systems and Materials. He is currently an associate editor of the IEEE Proceedings.

Sastry was elected a member of the National Academy of Engineering in 2001 and the American Academy of Arts and Sciences (AAAS) in 2004. He also received the President of India Gold Medal in 1977, the IBM Faculty Development award for 1983-1985, the NSF Presidential Young Investigator Award in 1985 and the Eckman Award of the American Automatic Control Council in 1990, the John R. Ragazzini Award for Distinguished Accomplishments in teaching in 2005, an M. A. (honoris causa) from Harvard in 1994, Fellow of the IEEE in 1994, the distinguished Alumnus Award of the Indian Institute of Technology in 1999, the David Marr prize for the best paper at the International Conference in Computer Vision in 1999, an honorary doctorate from the KTH Royal Institute of Technology in 2007, and the C.L. Tien Award for Academic Leadership in 2010. He has been a member of the Air Force Scientific Advisory Board from 2002-5 and the Defense Science Board in 2008 among other national boards. He is currently on the corporate board of HCL Technologies (India) and co-directs the C3.ai Digital Transformation Institute. Currently, He is serving as the chancellor of the Plaksha University, Mohali. He is on the scientific advisory boards of Interwest LLC, GE Software, and Eriksholm. He is ranked top 30 among electrical-engineering researchers worldwide.

Among his past students are engineer Stephen P. Boyd, network control theorist Linda Bushnell, computer scientist Yi Ma, control theorist Dawn Tilbury, aviation engineer Claire J. Tomlin, and computer scientist René Vidal. He also advised neurorehabilitation researcher David Reinkensmeyer while at UC Berkeley.
