= Roger W. Brockett =

American control theorist (1938–2023)

- Born: October 22, 1938; Seville, Ohio, U.S.
- Died: March 19, 2023 (aged 84); New Haven, Connecticut, U.S.
- Education: Case Western Reserve University.
- Scientific career
- Fields: Robotics; Control theory
- Workplaces: Harvard University
- Doctoral advisor: Mihajlo D. Mesarovic
- Doctoral students: John Baillieul; John Baras; David P. Dobkin; P. S. Krishnaprasad; Daniel Liberzon; Kristi Morgansen; Jan C. Willems
- Other notable students: Magnus Egerstedt; Stefano Soatto

Roger Ware Brockett (October 22, 1938 – March 19, 2023) was an American control theorist and the An Wang Professor of Computer Science and Electrical Engineering at Harvard University, who founded the Harvard Robotics Laboratory in 1983.

Brockett became a member of the National Academy of Engineering in 1991 for outstanding contributions to the theory and practice of linear and nonlinear control systems.

== Biography ==
Brockett was born on October 22, 1938, in Seville, Ohio, to Roger Lawrence and Grace Ester (Patch) Brockett.

Brockett received his B.S. from Case Western Reserve University in 1960, and continued on to receive his M.S. in 1962 and his Ph.D. in 1964 from Case Western Reserve University as well. His Ph.D. dissertation was The Invertibility of Dynamic Systems with Application to Control under the supervision of Mihajlo D. Mesarovic. At Case Western, Brockett was classmates with Donald Knuth.

After teaching at the Massachusetts Institute of Technology from 1963 to 1969, he joined the faculty at Harvard University. At Harvard, Brockett became the Gordon McKay Professor of Applied Mathematics and in 1989 the An Wang Professor of Computer Science and Electrical Engineering.

Brockett was known for his work on control theory and linear differential systems; in 1970 he published the textbook Finite Dimensional Linear Systems. Brockett has advised over 50 students, including Daniel Liberzon, Jan Willems, David Dobkin, John Baras, P. S. Krishnaprasad, and John Baillieul.

After experiencing a series of cardiac events, Brockett died at Yale New Haven Hospital in New Haven, Connecticut, on March 19, 2023, at the age of 84.

== Awards and honors ==
Brockett received several awards and honors, including:

- Fellow of the Institute of Electrical and Electronics Engineers (IEEE) since 1974
- Member of the National Academy of Engineering in 1991
- In 1989 the Richard E. Bellman Control Heritage Award from the American Automatic Control Council
- In 1991 the IEEE Control Systems Science and Engineering Award
- In 1996 the "W.T. and Idalia Reid Prize in Mathematics" from the Society for Industrial and Applied Mathematics
- In 2005 the Rufus Oldenburger Medal from the American Society of Mechanical Engineers
- In 2009 the IEEE Leon K. Kirchmayer Graduate Teaching Award
- In 2012 he became a fellow of the American Mathematical Society.
- In 2014 the John R. Ragazzini Award from the American Automatic Control Council
- In 2017 the Quazza Medal from the International Federation of Automatic Control
