= Mengdi Wang =

Theoretical computer scientist

- Education: Massachusetts Institute of Technology; Tsinghua University
- Scientific career
- Workplaces: Princeton University
- Thesis: Stochastic methods for large-scale linear problems, variational inequalities, and convex optimization (2013)
- Doctoral advisor: Dimitri Bertsekas

Mengdi Wang is a theoretical computer scientist who is a professor at Princeton University. Her research considers the fundamental theory that underpins reinforcement and machine learning. She was named one of MIT Technology Review's 35 Under 35 in 2018.

== Early life and education ==
Wang was an undergraduate student at Tsinghua University, where she specialized in automation. At the age of 18, she joined Massachusetts Institute of Technology as a graduate student, where she worked alongside Dimitri Bertsekas. Her doctoral research developed stochastic methods for large-scale linear systems.

== Research and career ==
Wang specializes in the theoretical frameworks that underpin machine learning and reinforcement learning. She joined Princeton University as an assistant professor in 2014. She was the first person to propose stochastic gradient methods for composition optimisation. Her early work used reinforcement to minimize risk in financial portfolios and help hospitals identify potential complications.

Wang has studied Markov decision processes, a model for reinforcement learning. She uses state compression methods to use empirical data to sketch black box Markov processes.

In 2020, Wang joined the C3.ai Digital Transformation Institute, a consortium of researchers who seek to accelerate the use of artificial intelligence in society. She proposed that reinforcement learning could be used to protect educational establishments from COVID-19. She used system identification and adaptive control to develop strategies to understand the health status of students, and to deploy algorithms that recommend interventions to decision makers. In 2024, she was awarded a United States Department of Defense Multidisciplinary University Research Initiative program to develop AI and reinforcement learning for biological systems. She showed it was possible to use large language models with semantic representation to design MRNA vaccines.

== Awards and honors ==
- 2016 Mathematical Optimization Society Young Researcher Prize in Continuous Optimization
- 2016 Princeton SEAS Innovation Award
- 2017 NSF Career Award
- 2017 Google Faculty Award
- 2018 MIT Tech Review 35-Under-35
- 2022 WAIC YunFan Award
- 2024 American Automatic Control Council Donald Eckman Award

== Selected publications ==
- Aaron Sidford; Mengdi Wang; Xian Wu; Lin Yang; Yinyu Ye (2018). "Near-Optimal Time and Sample Complexities for Solving Markov Decision Processes with a Generative Model" (PDF). Advances in Neural Information Processing Systems 31. Advances in Neural Information Processing Systems. Wikidata Q59481743.
- Mengdi Wang; Ji Liu; Ethan Fang (2016). "Accelerating Stochastic Composition Optimization" (PDF). Advances in Neural Information Processing Systems 29. Advances in Neural Information Processing Systems. Wikidata Q46993803.
- Junyu Zhang; Alec Koppel; Amrit Singh Bedi; Csaba Szepesvari; Mengdi Wang (November 2020). "Variational Policy Gradient Method for Reinforcement Learning with General Utilities" (PDF). Advances in Neural Information Processing Systems 33. Advances in Neural Information Processing Systems. Wikidata Q104090329.
