= Richard E. Bellman Control Heritage Award =

Award given by the American Automatic Control Council

The Richard E. Bellman Control Heritage Award is an annual award (since 1979) given by the American Automatic Control Council (AACC) for achievements in control theory, named after the applied mathematician Richard E. Bellman. The award is given for "distinguished career contributions to the theory or applications of automatic control", and it is the "highest recognition of professional achievement for U.S. control systems engineers and scientists".

The original name was Control Heritage Award, and it was initially only given for the engineering side of control.

== Recipients ==
The following individuals have received the AACC Richard E. Bellman Control Heritage Award:

- 1979: Hendrik Wade Bode
- 1980: Nathaniel B. Nichols
- 1981: Charles Stark Draper
- 1982: Irving Lefkowitz
- 1983: John V. Breakwell
- 1984: Richard E. Bellman
- 1985: Harold Chestnut
- 1986: John Zaborszky
- 1987: John C. Lozier
- 1988: Walter R. Evans
- 1989: Roger W. Brockett
- 1990: Arthur E. Bryson, Jr.
- 1991: John G. Truxal
- 1992: Rutherford Aris
- 1993: Eliahu I. Jury
- 1994: Jose B. Cruz, Jr.
- 1995: Michael Athans
- 1996: Elmer G. Gilbert
- 1997: Rudolf E. Kálmán
- 1998: Lotfi Asker Zadeh
- 1999: Yu-Chi Ho
- 2000: W. Harmon Ray
- 2001: A.V. Balakrishnan
- 2002: Petar V. Kokotovic
- 2003: Kumpati S. Narendra
- 2004: Harold J. Kushner
- 2005: Gene F. Franklin
- 2006: Tamer Başar
- 2007: Sanjoy K. Mitter
- 2008: Pravin Varaiya
- 2009: George Leitmann
- 2010: Dragoslav D. Šiljak
- 2011: Manfred Morari
- 2012: Arthur J. Krener
- 2013: A. Stephen Morse
- 2014: Dimitri Bertsekas
- 2015: Thomas F. Edgar
- 2016: Jason L. Speyer
- 2017: John Baras
- 2018: Masayoshi Tomizuka
- 2019: Irena Lasiecka
- 2020: Galip Ulsoy
- 2021: Miroslav Krstić
- 2022: Eduardo Sontag
- 2023: Stephen P. Boyd
- 2024: Naomi Leonard
- 2025: James B. Rawlings
- 2026: Claire J. Tomlin

== See also ==
- List of people in systems and control
- List of engineering awards
