= Aaron D. Ames =

American engineering researcher and professor

- Education: University of California, Berkeley; University of St. Thomas
- Scientific career
- Fields: Bipeds; Control theory
- Workplaces: California Institute of Technology; Georgia Institute of Technology; Texas A&M University
- Doctoral advisor: S. Shankar Sastry

Aaron D. Ames has been the Bren Professor of Mechanical and Civil Engineering and Control and Dynamical Systems at California Institute of Technology, in Pasadena, California, since 2017. Formerly, he was an associate professor of mechanical engineering and electrical and computer engineering at Georgia Institute of Technology, Atlanta, Georgia, and an associate professor of mechanical engineering at Texas A&M University, College Station, Texas.

Ames received his PhD in electrical and computer engineering from University of California, Berkeley in 2006 under S. Shankar Sastry. He was the recipient of the Donald P. Eckman Award in 2015 for his contributions in bipedal robotic research. He was also a recipient of the 2017 Okawa Foundation Research Grant for his research project entitled "Safety-Critical Autonomy in Robotic Locomotion". This prize honors top young researchers working in the fields of information and telecommunications.
