= Domitilla Del Vecchio =

Italian control theorist

Domitilla Del Vecchio is an Italian control theorist, whose research connects control theory to systems biology, synthetic biology, synthetic biological circuits, and regenerative medicine. She has also studied self-organization in traffic control. She is a professor of mechanical engineering at the Massachusetts Institute of Technology (MIT) and a member of the MIT Synthetic Biology Center.

== Education and career ==
Del Vecchio's father was a Roman engineer and her mother was a businesswoman. She earned a laurea at the University of Rome Tor Vergata in 1999, and completed a PhD in control theory and dynamical systems from the California Institute of Technology in 2005.

She became an assistant professor of electrical and engineering and computer science at the University of Michigan in 2006, also affiliated there with the Center for Computational Medicine and Bioinformatics. She moved to her present position at the Massachusetts Institute of Technology in 2010.

== Book ==
Del Vecchio is coauthor of the book Biomolecular Feedback Systems (with Richard M. Murray, Princeton University Press, 2014).

== Recognition ==
Del Vecchio was the 2010 winner of the Donald P. Eckman Award of the American Automatic Control Council, "for contributions to the theory and practice of hybrid dynamical systems and systems biology". She was named to the 2021 class of IEEE Fellows, "for contributions to circuit engineering in synthetic biology". She is also a Fellow of the International Federation of Automatic Control.
