= Daniel Liberzon =

Professor of electrical and computer engineering

Daniel M. Liberzon is the Richard T. Cheng Professor of Electrical and Computer Engineering at the University of Illinois at Urbana–Champaign.

== Biography ==
Daniel Liberzon was born in the former Soviet Union in 1973. He did his undergraduate studies in the Department of Mechanics and Mathematics at Moscow State University from 1989 to 1993. In 1993 he moved to the United States to pursue graduate studies in mathematics at Brandeis University, where he received his Ph.D. degree in 1998 (supervised by Prof. Roger W. Brockett of Harvard University). Following a postdoctoral position in the Department of Electrical Engineering at Yale University from 1998 to 2000 (with Prof. A. Stephen Morse), he joined the University of Illinois at Urbana–Champaign, where he is now a professor in the Electrical and Computer Engineering Department and the Coordinated Science Laboratory. His research interests include nonlinear control theory, switched and hybrid dynamical systems, control with limited information, and uncertain and stochastic systems. He is the author of the books "Switching in Systems and Control" (Birkhauser, 2003) and "Calculus of Variations and Optimal Control Theory: A Concise Introduction" (Princeton Univ. Press, 2012). He is also an editor for Automatica, where he specializes in an area of nonlinear systems and control. He delivered a plenary lecture at the 2008 American Control Conference.

== Awards ==
- IFAC Fellow, 2016, "for contributions to the theory of switched and hybrid systems, nonlinear control, and control with limited information."
- IEEE Fellow, 2013, "for contributions to analysis and design of switched, nonlinear and quantized control systems."
- Donald P. Eckman Award, 2007, "for contributions to the theories of switched systems and nonlinear control, and their application to control design under limited information."
- IFAC Young Author Prize, 2002, for the paper Stabilization by quantized state or output feedback: A hybrid control approach
- NSF CAREER Award, 2002, titled "Hybrid Control of Nonlinear Systems"
