= Julian Boyd =

Julian Boyd may refer to:

- Julian P. Boyd (1903–1980), American professor of history at Princeton University and first editor of The Papers of Thomas Jefferson
- Julian C. Boyd (1931–2005), American linguist, professor at the University of California, Berkeley
- Julian Boyd (basketball) (born 1990), American professional basketball player
