= Michael Athans =

Greek-American control theorist (1937–2020)

- Born: Michael Athanassiades; May 3, 1937; Drama, Greece
- Died: May 26, 2020 (aged 83); Clearwater, Florida, US
- Citizenship: American, Greece
- Education: University of California, Berkeley
- Known for: Optimal Control Theory
- Awards: Richard E. Bellman Control Heritage Award (1995); Hendrik Wade Bode Prize (1993); American Control Council's Education Award (1980); AAAS Fellow (1977); IEEE Fellow (1973); Frederick Emmons Terman Award (1969); Donald P. Eckman Award (1964)
- Scientific career
- Fields: Automatic Control theory
- Workplaces: Massachusetts Institute of Technology / Instituto Superior Técnico
- Thesis: Bang-Bang Control of Real Pole Systems
- Doctoral advisor: Otto J. M. Smith
- Doctoral students: Jeff S. Shamma; John Tsitsiklis; Hans Witsenhausen

Michael Athans (May 3, 1937 – May 26, 2020), born Michael Athanassiades, was a Greek-American control theorist and a Professor Emeritus in the Department of Electrical Engineering and Computer Science at the Massachusetts Institute of Technology. He was a Fellow of the IEEE (1973) and a Fellow of the AAAS (1977). He was the recipient of numerous awards for his contributions in the field of control theory. A pioneer in the field of control theory, he helped shape modern control theory and spearheaded the field of multivariable control system design and the field of robust control. Athans was a member of the technical staff at Lincoln Laboratory from 1961 to 1964, and a Department of Electrical Engineering and Computer Science faculty member from 1964 to 1998. Upon retirement, Athans moved to Lisbon, Portugal, where he was an Invited Research Professor in the Institute for Systems and Robotics, Instituto Superior Técnico where he received a honoris causa doctorate from the Universidade Técnica de Lisboa in 2011.

== Education ==
Athans received his B.S., M.S., and Ph.D. in Electrical Engineering from the University of California, Berkeley in 1958, 1959, and 1961, respectively.

== Academic career ==
From 1961 to 1964, Athans was employed as a member of the technical staff at the MIT Lincoln Laboratory, Lexington, Mass. where he conducted research in optimal control and estimation theory. From 1964, until his early retirement in 1998, he was a faculty member in the MIT Electrical Engineering and Computer Sciences department, where he held the rank of professor. He also was the director of the MIT Laboratory for Information and Decision Systems (LIDS) from 1974 to 1981. In 1978 he co-founded ALPHATECH Inc., Burlington, Mass., where he served as chairman of the board of directors. He has also consulted for numerous other industrial organizations and government panels. In 1995 he was visiting professor in the Department of Electrical and Computer Engineering at the National Technical University of Athens, Greece. From 1997 to 2011 he was an Invited Research Professor in the Institute for Systems and Robotics, Instituto Superior Técnico, Lisbon, Portugal.

Athans is the co-author of Optimal Control (McGraw Hill, 1966), Systems, Networks and Computation: Basic Concepts (McGraw Hill, 1972) and Systems, Networks and Computation: Multivariable Methods (McGraw Hill, 1974). In 1974 he developed 65 color TV lectures and study guides on Modern Control Theory. In addition he authored or co-authored over 350 technical papers and reports. His research interests and contributions span the areas of optimum system and estimation theory, robust and adaptive multivariable control systems, and the application of these methodologies to defense, large space structures, IVHS transportation systems, aerospace, marine, automotive, power, manufacturing, economic, and military C3 systems. His last research interests focused on dynamic models of the human immune system and robust adaptive control methodologies.

In 1964 Athans was the first recipient of the American Automatic Control Council's Donald P. Eckman Award "for outstanding contributions to the field of automatic control". In 1969 he was the first recipient of the Frederick E. Terman Award of the American Society for Engineering Education as "the outstanding young electrical engineering educator." In 1980 he received the second Education Award of the American Control Council for his "outstanding contributions and distinguished leadership in automatic control education." In 1973 he was elected Fellow of the IEEE and in 1977 Fellow of the AAAS. In 1983 he was elected Distinguished Member of the IEEE Control Systems Society. He received the 1993 H.W. Bode Prize from the IEEE Control Systems Society, which also included the delivery of the Bode Plenary Lecture at the 1993 IEEE Conference on Decision and Control. He was the recipient of the Richard E. Bellman Control Heritage Award of the American Automatic Control Council "In Recognition of a Distinguished Career in Automatic Control; As a Leader and Champion of Innovative Research; As a Contributor to Fundamental Knowledge in Optimal, Adaptive, Robust, Decentralized and Distributed Control; and as a Mentor to his Students" presented in June 1995 at the American Control Conference. In 1996 he was awarded honorary doctorates from the National Technical University of Athens, Greece, and from the Technical University of Crete, Chania, Crete, Greece. In July 2002 he was awarded the Ktisivos Award, “In recognition of contributions to control and estimation theory, awarded by the Mediterranean Control and Automation Association. He was the recipient of a Polish Academy of Sciences Medal, “For contributions to Control Theory” in Warsaw, Poland, on June 30, 2005. In 2006 the Institute of Electrical and Electronics Engineers (IEEE) elected him Life Fellow.

Athans served in numerous committees of IEEE, IFAC, AACC and AAAS; he was president of the IEEE Control Systems Society from 1972 to 1974. In addition he was a member of AIAA, Phi Beta Kappa, Eta Kappa Nu, and Sigma Xi. He served as associate editor of the IEEE Transactions on Automatic Control, Journal of Dynamic Systems and Control, and the IFAC journal Automatica.

== Awards ==
- American Automatic Control Council: Donald P. Eckman Award "for outstanding contributions to the field of automatic control" in 1964.
- American Society for Engineering Education: Frederick Emmons Terman Award as "the outstanding young electrical engineering educator" in 1969.
- American Automatic Control Council: John R. Ragazzini Award for "outstanding contributions and distinguished leadership in automatic control education" in 1980.
- IEEE Control Systems Society's 1993 Hendrik Wade Bode Prize.
- American Automatic Control Council: Richard E. Bellman Control Heritage Award in 1995.
- Honoris causa doctorate from Universidade Técnica de Lisboa in 2011.
