= Dragoslav D. Šiljak =

Serbian electrical engineer (1933–2025)

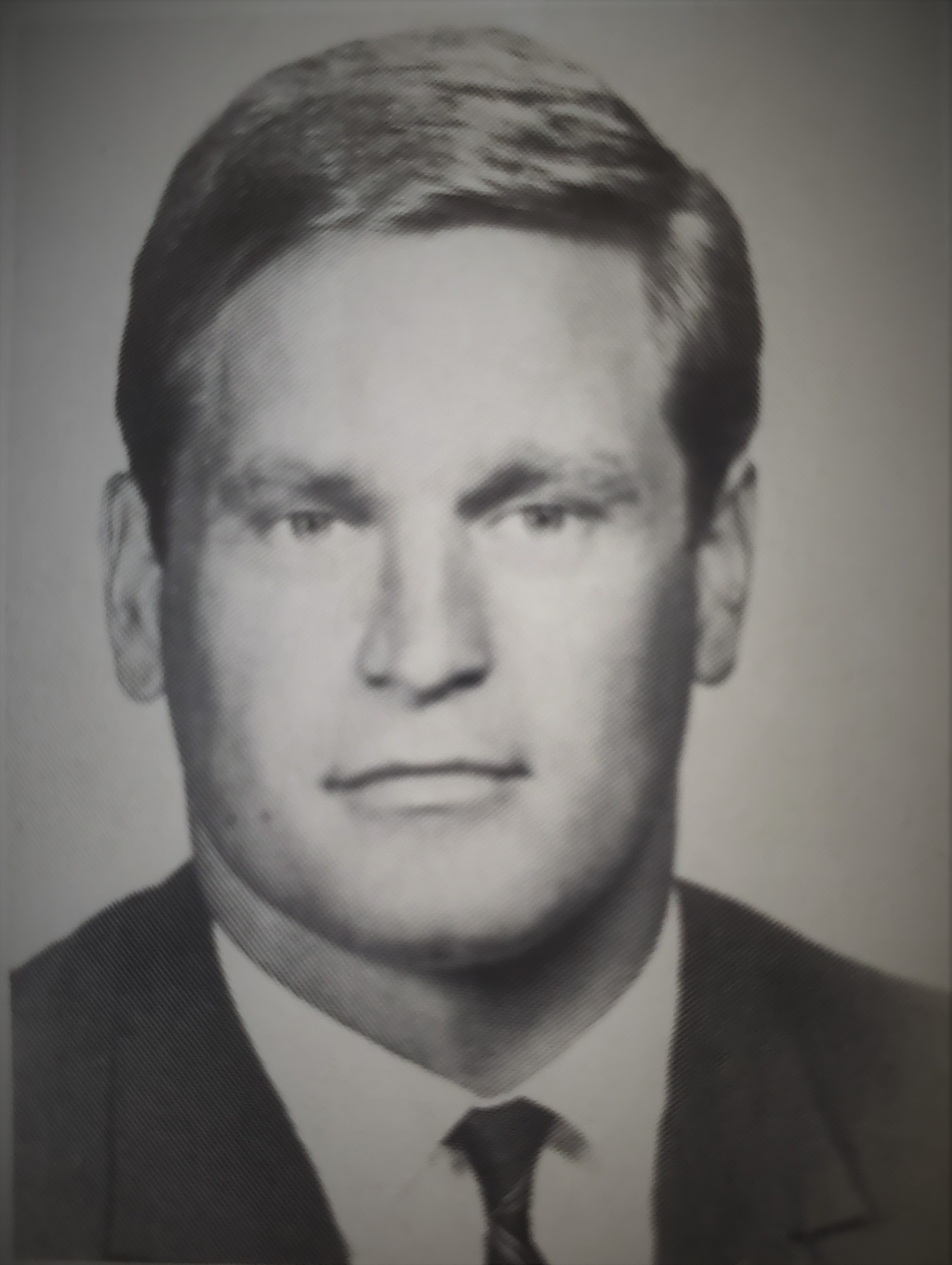
Dragoslav Šiljak in 1965

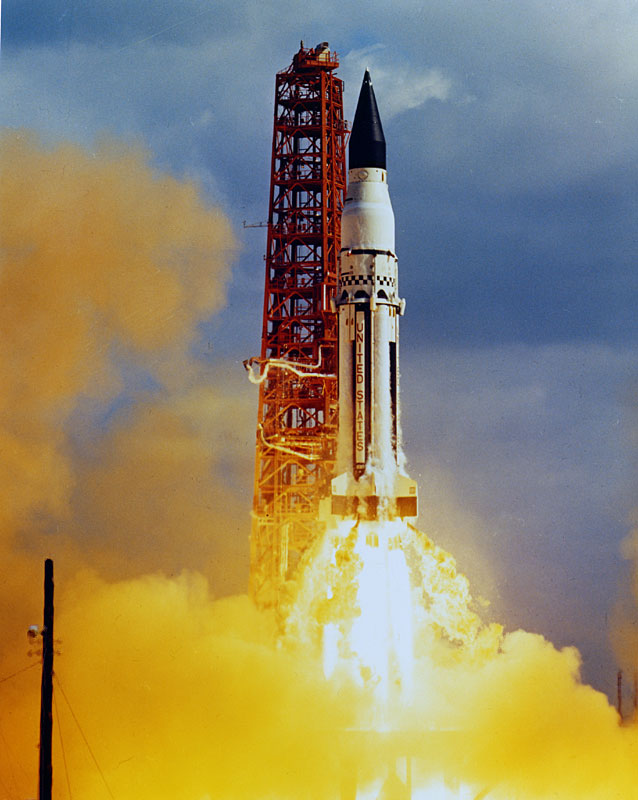
Dragoslav Šiljak co-designed the navigation and control system for the Saturn V rocket booster.

Dragoslav D. Šiljak (Serbian Cyrillic: Драгослав Шиљак; September 10, 1933 – November 16, 2025) was a Serbian electrical engineer who was professor emeritus of Electrical Engineering at Santa Clara University, where he held the title of Benjamin and Mae Swig University Professor. He is best known for developing the mathematical theory and methods for control of complex dynamic systems characterized by large-scale, information structure constraints and uncertainty.

== Life and academic career ==
Šiljak was born in Belgrade, Kingdom of Yugoslavia on September 10, 1933, to Dobrilo and Ljubica (née Živanović). He earned his bachelor's degree from the School of Electrical Engineering at the University of Belgrade in the field of Automatic Control Systems in 1957. By 1963, he had received both his Master's and Ph.D. degrees under the supervision of Professor Dušan Mitrović; and he was appointed Docent Professor in that same year. As a graduate student, he studied stability and optimal control in mathematical system theory, and discovered that optimal control may result in a low degree of stability. In his dissertation, he proposed a method for optimization of control under stability constraints. He published some of these results in top U.S. journals in control engineering,

One of the papers caught the attention of G.J. Thaler, a professor at Santa Clara University, who convinced the Dean of Engineering to extend an invitation to Šiljak to join the faculty of the Engineering School. He arrived on the Mission Campus in 1964. There he taught courses in Electrical Engineering and Applied Mathematics.

In 1967, Šiljak married Dragana (née Todorovic). They have two children, Ana and Matija, and five grandchildren. He died on November 16, 2025, at the age of 92.

== Research ==
Shortly after his arrival at Santa Clara, Šiljak was awarded a multi-year grant from the National Aeronautics and Space Administration (NASA) to develop multi-parameter space methods for the stability analysis and design of robust control systems to space structures. Some of the results of this research were published in his 1969 book, Nonlinear Systems: The Parameter Analysis and Design. With J.S. Karmarkar, he formulated the methods for computer aided design of control systems, using mathematical programming techniques for both linear and non-linear systems. At the Astrionics Laboratory of NASA's George C. Marshall Space Flight Center, Šiljak collaborated with Sherman Selzer to design the navigation and control systems for the Saturn V Rocket, which propelled astronauts to the moon in the 1969 Apollo 11 lunar mission.

In the early 1970s, Šiljak considered large-scale dynamic systems composed of interconnected sub-systems with uncertain interconnections, based on graph-theoretic methods and vector Lyapunov Functions. He applied the theory to the decentralized control of the Large Space Telescope and Skylab built by NASA. He defined the concept of "connective stability": a system is considered stable when it remains stable despite the disconnection and re-connection of subsystems during operation. He established the methods for determining the conditions for connective stability within the mathematical framework of the comparison principle in differential inequalities and vector Lyapunov functions. He applied these methods to a wide variety of models, including large space structures, competitive equilibrium in multi-market systems, multi-species communities in population biology, and large scale power systems.

In the 1980s, Šiljak and his collaborators developed a large number of new and highly original concepts and methods for the decentralized control of uncertain large-scale interconnected systems. He introduced new notions of overlapping sub-systems and decompositions to formulate the inclusion principle. The principle described the process of expansion and contraction of dynamic systems that serve the purpose of rewriting overlapping decompositions as disjoint, which, in turn, allows the standard methods for control design. Structurally fixed modes, multiple controllers for reliable stabilization, decentralized optimization, and hierarchical, epsilon, and overlapping decompositions laid the foundation for a powerful and efficient approach to a broad set of problems in control design of large complex systems. This development was reported in a comprehensive monograph, Decentralized Control of Complex Systems.

In the following two decades, Šiljak and his collaborators raised the research on complex systems to a higher level. Decomposition schemes involving inputs and outputs were developed for and applied to complex systems of unprecedented dimensions. Dynamic graphs were defined in a linear space as one parameter group of transformations of the graph space into itself. This new mathematical entity opened the possibility to include continuous Boolean networks in a theoretical study of gene regulation and modeling of large-scale organic structures. These new and exciting developments were published in Control of Complex Systems: Structural Constraints and Uncertainty, co-authored with A.I. Zecevic.

In 2004, a special issue in his honor was published in two numbers of the mathematical journal Dynamics of Continuous, Discrete, and Impulsive System, and it contained articles from leading scholars in the field of dynamic systems. A survey of the selected works of Dragoslav Šiljak can be found in "An Overview of the Collected Works of Dragoslav Siljak" by Zoran Gajić and Masao Ikeda, published in Dynamics of Continuous, Discrete and Impulsive Systems Series A: Mathematical Analysis.

== Awards ==
In 1981, Šiljak served as a Distinguished Scholar of the Japan Society for Promotion of Science. In that same year he became a Fellow of the Institute of Electrical and Electronics Engineers (IEEE), "for contributions to the theory of nonlinear control and large-scale systems". He was selected as a Distinguished Professor of the Fulbright Foundation in 1984, and in 1985 became an International Member of the Serbian Academy of Arts and Sciences. In 1986, he served as a Director of the NSF Workshop “Challenges to Control: A Collective View,” organizing a forum of top control scientists at Santa Clara University for the purpose of assessing the state of the art of the field and outlining directions of research. In 1991, he gave a week-long seminar on decentralized control at the Seoul National University as a Hoam Distinguished Foreign Scholar. In 2001, he became a Life Fellow of the IEEE.

In 2010, he received the Richard E. Bellman Control Heritage Award from the American Automatic Control Council, "for his fundamental contributions to the theory of large-scale systems, decentralized control, and parametric approach to robust stability".

== Sports career ==
Šiljak was a member of the national water polo team of Yugoslavia that won the silver medal at the 1952 Olympic Games in Helsinki, Finland. He was again a member of the team when it won the World Cup “Trofeo Italia” played in Nijmegen, The Netherlands, in 1953. Šiljak played water polo for the club “Jadran“ of Herceg Novi when the club won The National Championship of Yugoslavia in 1958 and 1959. He was a member of the club “Partizan," Belgrade when the club won the Yugoslav Championship in 1963 and became the “Champion of Champions” by winning the Tournament of European Water Polo Champions in Zagreb, Croatia, in 1964.

== Works ==
Books

- Nonlinear Systems: The Parameter Analysis and Design, John Wiley (1969)
- Large-Scale Dynamic Systems: Stability and Structure, North-Holland (1978)
- Decentralized Control of Complex Systems, Academic Press (1991), published in Russian as Децентрализованное управление сложными системами, Mir (1994).
- Control of Complex Systems: Structural Constraints and Uncertainty, Springer Verlag (2010, with A. I. Zečević)
- Stablinost sistema upravljanja (The Stability of Control Systems), Elektrotehniĉki fakultet u Beogradu (1974)

Select articles

- "Connective Stability of Complex Ecosystems," Nature (1974).
- "Connective Stability of Competitive Equilibrium," Automatica (1975).
- "Competitive Economic Systems: Stability, Decomposition, and Aggregation," IEEE Transactions on Automatic Control (1976).
- "Competitive Analysis of the Arms Race," Annals of Economic and Social Measurement (1976).
- "On the stability of the arms race." Mathematical Systems in International Relations Research (1977).
- "An Improved Block-Parallel Newton Method via Epsilon Decompositions for Load Flow Calculations," IEEE Transactions on Power Systems (1978).
- "Lotka-Volterra Equations: Decomposition, Stability, and Structure," Journal of Mathematical Biology (1980) (with M. Ikeda).
- "Structurally Fixed Modes," Systems and Control Letters (1981).
- "Decentralized Control with Overlapping Information Sets," Journal of Optimization Theory and Applications (1981).
- "An Inclusion Principle for Hereditary Systems," Journal of Mathematical Analysis and Applications (1984).
- "Nested Epsilon Decompositions of Linear Systems: Weakly Coupled and Overlapping Blocks," SIAM Journal on Matrix Analysis and Applications (1991).
- "Optimal Decentralized Control for Stochastic Dynamic Systems," Recent Trends in Optimization Theory and Applications (1995).
- "Coherency Recognition Using Epsilon Decomposition," IEEE Transactions on Power Systems (1998).
- "Dynamic Graphs," Nonlinear Analysis: Hybrid Systems (2008).
- "Inclusion Principle for Descriptor Systems," IEEE Transactions on Automatic Control (2009).
- "Consensus at Competitive Equilibrium: Dynamic Flow of Autonomous Cars in Traffic Networks" (2017).
