= John C. Lozier =

- Citizenship: American
- Awards: Richard E. Bellman Control Heritage Award (1987)
- Scientific career
- Fields: Control theory

John C. Lozier is a noted American control engineer. He was responsible for the control of the Telstar ground-tracking antenna installed near Andover, Maine, and the Brittany Peninsula in France. This equipment, involving real-time computer control, enabled the first transatlantic TV operation in 1962.

Lozier served as the president of the American Automatic Control Council from 1960 to 1962 and as the president of the International Federation of Automatic Control from 1972 to 1975.

He received numerous awards for his contribution to the field of control theory, including the Richard E. Bellman Control Heritage Award in 1987.
