= Yi Ma =

Chinese engineer and computer scientist

Yi Ma is a professor in Electrical Engineering and Computer Sciences at the University of California, Berkeley. Ma was named an IEEE Fellow in 2013 for contributions to computer vision and pattern recognition, an ACM Fellow in 2017 "for contributions to theory and application of low-dimensional models for computer vision and pattern recognition", and a SIAM Fellow in 2020 for "contributions to the theory and algorithms for low-dimensional models and their applications in computer vision and image processing". He received the David Marr Prize with Stefano Soatto, Jana Košecká, and Shankar Sastry for their paper Euclidean reconstruction and reprojection up to subgroups (ICCV, 1999).
