= Kristi Morgansen =

American control theorist

Kristi A. Morgansen Hill is an American control theorist specializing in nonlinear control and its applications in biologically inspired sensing and motion, including the motion of robot fish. She is Boeing-Egtvedt Endowed Professor and chair of the William E. Boeing Department of Aeronautics and Astronautics at the University of Washington.

== Education and career ==
Morgansen studied mechanical engineering at Boston University, where she earned a bachelor's degree in 1994 and a master's degree in 1995. Next, she moved to Harvard University, where she earned a second master's degree in applied mathematics in 1996 and a Ph.D. in Engineering Sciences in 1999. Her doctoral dissertation, Temporal Patterns in Learning and Control, was supervised by Roger W. Brockett.

After postdoctoral research at the California Institute of Technology, she joined the University of Washington faculty in 2002. She was named as the Boeing-Egtvedt Endowed Professor in 2022.

== Recognition ==
Morgansen was named as a Fellow of the American Institute of Aeronautics and Astronautics in 2021.
