= Irene Gregory =

American aerospace engineer

Irene Michelle Gregory is an American aerospace engineer whose research involves control theory and its applications in the control of aircraft. In works with Naira Hovakimyan and others, she has pioneered the use of $\mathcal{L}_1$ adaptive control techniques in this application, which combine the protection against uncertain data or modeling errors of robust control with the fast estimation provided by adaptive control. She works as senior technologist for advanced control theory and applications in the NASA Engineering & Safety Center at the Langley Research Center.

== Education and career ==
Gregory studied aeronautics and astronautics at the Massachusetts Institute of Technology, earning bachelor's and master's degrees there, and has been working at the Langley Research Center since at least 1991.

She completed a Ph.D. in Control and Dynamic Systems at the California Institute of Technology, in 2004. Her doctoral dissertation, Design and Stability Analysis of an Integrated Controller for Highly Flexible Advanced Aircraft Utilizing the Novel Nonlinear Dynamic Inversion, was supervised by John Doyle.

== Recognition ==
Gregory was named as a Fellow of the American Institute of Aeronautics and Astronautics in 2021.
