= James B. Rawlings =

American university professor

- Born: April 3, 1957 (age 69)
- Education: University of Wisconsin-Madison (PhD, 1985); University of Texas at Austin (BS, 1979)
- Known for: process control, model predictive control
- Scientific career
- Fields: Chemical engineering
- Workplaces: University of California, Santa Barbara; University of Wisconsin-Madison

James B. Rawlings is an American chemical engineering professor and Mellichamp Process Control Chair at the University of California, Santa Barbara. His research focuses on process monitoring and control, specifically the development of methods for moving horizon estimation and model predictive control in chemical processes.

== Education ==
Rawlings earned his undergraduate degree in chemical engineering at the University of Texas at Austin. He completed his Ph.D. in chemical engineering at the University of Wisconsin-Madison. His postdoctoral research in 1985 was conducted as a NATO postdoctoral fellow at the Institute for System Dynamics and Process Control at the University of Stuttgart, Germany.

== Research and career ==
Rawlings began his academic career at the University of Texas at Austin as an assistant professor in 1986 and later became an associate professor. In 1995, Rawlings joined the faculty at the University of Wisconsin-Madison as a full professor where he held the Paul A. Elfers Chair in Chemical and Biological Engineering. His research at Wisconsin centered on chemical process monitoring and control and on reaction engineering at the molecular level. In 2016, Rawlings joined the faculty at the University of California, Santa Barbara as the Mellichamp Process Control Chair. His research at UCSB continues to focus on process monitoring and control, as well as computational modeling.

GNU Octave was originally developed by John W. Eaton, a doctoral student in Rawlings' research group, beginning around 1988 as companion software for an undergraduate chemical reactor design course. Rawlings has been a longtime user and advocate of the project.

== Selected publications ==
- Rawlings, James B.; Mayne, David Q.; Diehl, Moritz M. (2017). Model Predictive Control: Theory, Computation, and Design (PDF) (2nd ed.). Nob Hill Publishing. ISBN 9780975937730.
- Rawlings, James B.; Ekerdt, John G. (2012). Chemical Reactor Analysis and Design Fundamentals (PDF) (2nd ed.). Nob Hill Publishing. ISBN 9780975937723.

== Honors and awards ==
Rawlings has received numerous awards throughout his career, including:

- 2025: John M. Prausnitz Institute Lecturer, American Institute of Chemical Engineers (AIChE)
- 2025: Richard E. Bellman Control Heritage Award, American Automatic Control Council
- 2024: Warren K. Lewis Award, AIChE
- 2019: Distinguished Engineering Graduate Award, The University of Texas
- 2018: Mellichamp Process Control Chair, University of California, Santa Barbara
- 2017: William H. Walker Award,
- 2016: National Academy of Engineering
- 2016: Fellow, IFAC
- 2016: Process Automation Hall of Fame
- 2013: Nordic Process Control Award
- 2012: Fellow, IEEE
- 2011: John R. Ragazzini Award, American Automatic Control Council
- 2011: “Doctor technices honoris causa,” Technical University of Denmark
- 2011: Inaugural High Impact Paper Award, International Federation of Automatic Control
- 2009: Fellow, AIChE
- 1999: Computing in Chemical Engineering Award, AIChE
