= Jana Košecká =

Slovak computer scientist

Jana Košecká is a Slovak computer scientist specializing in computer vision. She is a professor of computer science at George Mason University. Previously, Košecká was a researcher at Stanford University and the University of California, Berkeley.

== Education and career ==
Košecká earned bachelor's and master's degrees in electrical engineering and computer science at the Slovak University of Technology in Bratislava; her master's thesis was on agricultural applications of artificial intelligence. After seeing a conference talk on robotics by Ruzena Bajcsy, she became interested in the subject and moved to the General Robotics, Automation, Sensing & Perception Laboratory at the University of Pennsylvania, where she completed her Ph.D. with Bajcsy as her doctoral advisor in 1996. Her dissertation was A Framework for Modeling and Verifying Visually Guided Agents: Design, Analysis and Experiments. She held visiting positions at Google, and Nokia Research.

Košecká spent three years doing postdoctoral research on the applications of computer vision to self-driving cars at the University of California, Berkeley, before taking her present position as a faculty member at George Mason University. During her time at Berkeley, Košecká was a visiting scholar at Stanford University.

== Book ==
With Yi Ma, Stefano Soatto, and S. Shankar Sastry, Košecká is the author of the book An Invitation to 3-D Vision: From Images to Geometric Models (Springer, 2004).

== Recognition ==
With Ma, Soatto, and Shastry, Košecká won the 1999 Marr Prize for their paper "Euclidean reconstruction and reprojection up to subgroups". She was a keynote speaker at the 2018 International Conference on Robotics and Automation.
