= Frank L. Lewis =

American electrical engineer, academic and researcher

- Born: Germany
- Occupations: Electrical engineer, academic and researcher
- Awards: National Academy of Inventors. IEEE Life Fellow. Fulbright fellow. Ragazzini Education Award, American Automatic Control Council. American Institute of Aeronautics and Astronautics Intelligent Systems Award. State of Texas Regents Outstanding Teacher Award. Neural Networks Pioneer Award, IEEE Computational Intelligence Society. U.K. Honeywell International Medal for Control Technology. Gabor Award, Neural Network Society. Terman Award, American Society Engineering Education.

Academic background
- Education: Rice University, BA, MEE, 1971; University of West Florida, MAE, 1977; Georgia Institute of Technology, PhD 1981
- Thesis: A Geometrical Approach to Linear Systems Based on the Riccati Equation (1981)

Academic work
- Institutions: University of Texas at Arlington
- Notable students: Kyriakos G. Vamvoudakis

Frank L. Lewis is an American electrical engineer, academic and researcher. He is an Emeritus Professor of electrical engineering, former Moncrief-O’Donnell Endowed Chair, and former head of Advanced Controls and Sensors Group at The University of Texas at Arlington (UTA). He is a member of UTA Academy of Distinguished Teachers and a charter member of UTA Academy of Distinguished Scholars.

Lewis is a Thomson Reuters Web of Science highly cited Researcher. He is Ranked as number 23 in the world and 12 in the USA of all scientists in Electronics and Electrical Engineering by Research.com. He has authored 30 books, including Optimal Control, Optimal Estimation, Aircraft Control and Simulation, Applied Optimal Control and Estimation, and Robot Manipulator Control.

Lewis is a Fellow of National Academy of Inventors (NAI), Institute of Electrical and Electronics Engineers (IEEE), U.K. Institute of Measurement and Control, International Federation of Automatic Control (IFAC), and American Association for the Advancement of Science (AAAS).

== Education ==
Lewis studied at Rice University and received his bachelor's degree in physics and his master's degree in electrical engineering in 1971. He obtained his master's degree in aeronautical systems from University of West Florida in 1977. He then attended Georgia Institute of Technology and received his doctoral degree in electrical engineering in 1981. In 1992, he received his certification and licensure as Professional Engineer from State of Texas. He was certified as Chartered Engineer by United Kingdom Engineering Council in 2006.

== Career ==
Lewis served as an officer in the US Navy from 1971 to 1977, serving as navigator and executive efficer before retiring as commanding officer, USS Salinan (ATF-161). Following his doctoral degree, he was appointed as assistant professor at Georgia Tech in 1981. He was promoted to associate professor in 1986, and to professor in 1990. He left Georgia Institute of Technology in the same year and joined the University of Texas at Arlington in 1990 as professor of electrical engineering, Moncrief-O'Donnell Endowed Chair, and head of Advanced Controls and Sensors Group at UTA Research Institute (UTARI).

Lewis held industry appointments at Texas Nuclear Company and Columbia Scientific Company, in 1969 and 1970, respectively. He was a microprocessor design technician at Colonial Pipeline Company in 1970. From 1983 till 1987, he served as a consultant in aircraft adaptive controls at Lockheed Advanced Research Organization, Atlanta, Georgia.

He serves as an editor and editor-in-chief of journals and book series including Taylor and Francis Book Series on Automation & Control Engineering, Transactions of the Institute of Measurement and Control, and Journal of Control Theory Technology. He is also a founder of International Symposium on Autonomous Systems (ISAS). He is a Founding Chair of the Mediterranean Control Association.

== Research ==
Lewis has made seminal contributions in the design of engineering automatic feedback controllers since 1983. He is Ranked as number 23 in the world and 12 in the USA of all scientists in Electronics and Electrical Engineering by Research.com. He made fundamental contributions in fields including cooperative multi-agent distributed systems, Reinforcement Learning in Control, Intelligent Control, Artificial Intelligence (AI), Nonlinear Control Systems, Robot System Control, Robust and Adaptive Control, Aircraft Control systems, Discrete-Event Systems, Manufacturing Process Control and Scheduling. He has written more than 548 journal papers and 30 books.

=== Intelligent neural-adaptive nonlinear control ===
Lewis was among the pioneers in the 1990s to provide rigorous mathematical proof techniques and design algorithms for Intelligent Control systems that incorporate machine learning techniques including neural networks into adaptive feedback control systems. This was a precursor to modern (AI) techniques. He developed a new generation of nonlinear adaptive feedback controller structures with significantly improved performance for nonlinear dynamic systems, robotics, and intelligent aircraft flight control. The essential contributions of this technology were to use mathematics based on Lyapunov Stability Theory, passivity, and nonlinear-in-the-parameters function approximation to invent novel feedback structures and parameter tuning laws that combine neural net backpropagation machine learning with adaptive feedback control robustifying terms.

=== Reinforcement learning ===
Since 2006 Lewis has developed a new generation of Optimal adaptive controllers for continuous-time dynamical systems using the new notion of Integral Reinforcement Learning (IRL). This allows the adaptive learning of Optimal control solutions online in real time. Using IRL, rigorous mathematical proofs can be developed for continuous-time systems Optimal control and yield a new two-timescale Actor-Critic architecture. This two-level Adaptive Dynamic Programming (ADP) structure resulted in a new generation of Policy Iteration Algorithms for continuous-time systems that significantly improved existing adaptive controllers by allowing them to learn Optimal Control solutions by measuring data online and hence to minimize prescribed performance indices such as minimum energy, minimum fuel, minimum time.

== Awards and honors ==
National Academy of Inventors Fellow

- 1988 - Fulbright Fellow Award for Program of Educational Exchange Between the United States and Greece
- 1989 - American Society Engineering Education Frederick E. Terman Award for Authors Under Forty
- 1990 - Moncrief-O'Donnell Endowed Chair, The University of Texas at Arlington
- 1994 - IEEE Control Systems Society International Outstanding Chapter Award
- 1995 - Appointed to 'NASA Committee on the Space Station’, National Academy of Engineering
- 1995 - Engineer of the Year, Ft. Worth IEEE Section
- 1997 - Sigma Xi National "Certificate of Excellence", The University of Texas at Arlington (UTA)
- 2009 - Gabor Award, Neural Network Society
- 2009 - Honeywell International Medal for Control Technology, Institute of Measurement and Control
- 2012 - IEEE Computational Intelligence Society Neural Networks Pioneer Award
- 2012–2015 - "Distinguished Lecturer", IEEE Control Systems Society
- 2013 - Outstanding Teacher Award, State of Texas Regents
- 2016 - American Institute of Aeronautics and Astronautics Intelligent Systems Award [25]
- 2016 - Thomson Reuters Web of Science Highly Cited Researcher
- 2017 - Member, European Union Academy of Sciences
- 2017 - Liaoning Province International Science and Technology Cooperation Award
- 2018 - John Ragazzini Education Award, American Automatic Control Council
- 2020 - Awarded Top 1% Highly Top Cited Researcher by Clarivate Web of Science.

== Bibliography ==
=== Books ===
- B.L. Stevens, F.L. Lewis, and E.N. Johnson, Aircraft Control and Simulation: Dynamics, Control, and Autonomous Systems, John Wiley and Sons, New York, Third Edition, 2016.
- F.L. Lewis, D. Vrabie, and V. Syrmos, Optimal Control, third edition, John Wiley and Sons, New York, 2012.
- F.L. Lewis, D.M. Dawson, and C.T. Abdallah, Robot Manipulator Control: Theory and Practice, 2nd edition, Revised and Expanded, CRC Press, Boca Raton, 2006.
- D. Vrabie, K. Vamvoudakis, and F.L. Lewis, Optimal Adaptive Control and Differential Games by Reinforcement Learning Principles, IET Press, 2012.
- F.L. Lewis, Hongwei Zhang, K. Hengster-Movric, Abhijit Das, Cooperative Control of Multi-Agent Systems: Optimal and Adaptive Design Approaches, Springer-Verlag, Berlin, 2014.

=== Selected articles ===
- Bahare Kiumarsi, K. Vamvoudakis, H. Modares, and F.L. Lewis, “Optimal and Autonomous Control Using Reinforcement Learning: A Survey,” IEEE Trans. Neural Networks and Learning Systems, vol. 29, no. 6, pp. 2042–2061, June 2018.
- K.G. Vamvoudakis, H. Modares, B. Kiumarsi, and F.l. Lewis, “Game Theory-Based Control System Algorithms with Real-Time Reinforcement Learning,” IEEE Control Systems Magazine, pp. 33–52, Feb. 2017.
- Victor G. Lopez, F.L. Lewis, Yan Wan, Edgar N. Sanchez, and Lingling Fan, “Solutions for Multiagent Pursuit-Evasion Games on Communication Graphs: Finite-Time Capture and Asymptotic Behaviors,” IEEE Transactions on Automatic Control, vol. 65, no. 5, pp. 1911–1923, May 2020. DOI 10.1109/TAC.2019.2926554.
- Shan Zuo, F.L. Lewis, Ali Davoudi, “Resilient Output Containment of Heterogeneous Cooperative and Adversarial Multi-Group Systems,” IEEE Transactions on Automatic Control, vol. 66, no. 7, pp. 3104–3111, July 2020. DOI 10.1109/TAC.2019.2947620.
- Shan Zuo, O. A. Beg, F. L. Lewis and A. Davoudi, "Resilient Networked AC Microgrids Under Unbounded Cyber Attacks," IEEE Transactions on Smart Grid, Vol. 11, No. 5, pp. 3785–3794, September 2020. DOI 10.1109/TSG.2020.2984266.
