= P. S. Krishnaprasad =

Indian-American electrical engineer

- Born: India
- Education: Harvard University (PhD)
- Known for: Geometric control theory Bat echolocation research Smart materials
- Awards: IEEE Fellow (1990); Hendrik W. Bode Lecture Prize (2007)
- Scientific career
- Fields: Electrical engineering Control theory Geometric mechanics Robotics
- Workplaces: University of Maryland, College Park; Case Western Reserve University
- Doctoral advisor: Roger W. Brockett
- Doctoral students: Naomi Leonard; Xiaobo Tan; Fumin Zhang

Perinkulam Sambamurthy Krishnaprasad (commonly cited as P. S. Krishnaprasad) is an Indian-American electrical engineer and applied mathematician. He is a professor in the Department of Electrical and Computer Engineering and the Institute for Systems Research at the University of Maryland, College Park. His research focuses on geometric control theory, geometric mechanics, robotics, and biologically-inspired control systems.

Krishnaprasad was elected a Fellow of the Institute of Electrical and Electronics Engineers (IEEE) in 1990 for his contributions to geometric and nonlinear control and to engineering education. He received the 2007 Hendrik W. Bode Lecture Prize from the IEEE Control Systems Society for fundamental contributions to the theory of control of natural and synthetic systems.

== Education ==
Krishnaprasad received his Ph.D. in applied mathematics from Harvard University in 1977, with a dissertation titled "Geometry of Minimal Systems and the Identification Problem." His doctoral advisor was Roger W. Brockett, a pioneer of modern control theory who later co-founded the Institute for Systems Research with Krishnaprasad and others.

== Career ==
After completing his doctorate, Krishnaprasad joined the faculty of the Systems Engineering Department at Case Western Reserve University, where he taught from 1977 to 1980. He joined the University of Maryland in August 1980 and became a full professor in 1987. Since 1988, he has held a joint appointment with the Institute for Systems Research.

Krishnaprasad is also a faculty member of the Program in Applied Mathematics and Statistics, and Scientific Computation, and the Program in Neuroscience and Cognitive Science. Since 1987, he has directed the Intelligent Servosystems Laboratory, where experimental research has included flexible robot arms, tactile perception, nonholonomic robot design, smart material actuators, and mobile robotics.

He has held visiting positions at Erasmus University Rotterdam; the Department of Mathematics at the University of California, Berkeley; the University of Groningen; the California Institute of Technology; the Mathematical Sciences Institute at Cornell University; and the Department of Mechanical and Aerospace Engineering at Princeton University.

== Research ==
Krishnaprasad's research spans geometric control theory, filtering and signal processing theory, robotics, acoustics, and biologically-inspired approaches to control, sensing, and computation. His contributions include work on the geometry of parametrization problems in linear systems, Lie algebraic foundations of nonlinear filtering, stability of interconnected mechanical systems, and symmetry principles in nonlinear control theory.

=== Smart materials and hysteresis ===
Krishnaprasad has made significant contributions to the control of smart materials, particularly piezoelectric and magnetostrictive actuators. His work on the Preisach model of hysteresis and its approximate inversion has been applied to micro-positioning control.

=== Bat echolocation and pursuit strategies ===
Krishnaprasad has conducted research on the prey capture strategies of echolocating bats, demonstrating that they use a nearly time-optimal interception strategy similar to that implemented in guided missiles. This research, published in PLOS Biology in 2006, showed that bats use a constant absolute target direction strategy rather than the constant bearing strategy used by many other predators.

=== Collective behavior and formations ===
His current research focuses on collective behavior in biological systems and its applications to engineered systems, including robotic swarms. This includes work on steering laws for planar formations and motion camouflage strategies observed in pursuit behaviors.

== Notable students ==
Krishnaprasad has advised more than 30 doctoral students, many of whom have become prominent researchers in control theory and robotics. His notable doctoral students include:

- Naomi Leonard (Ph.D. 1994), Edwin S. Wilsey Professor at Princeton University and recipient of the 2017 Bode Lecture Prize
- Xiaobo Tan (Ph.D. 2002), MSU Foundation Professor at Michigan State University and IEEE Fellow
- Fumin Zhang (Ph.D. 2004), professor at Georgia Institute of Technology and IEEE Fellow

== Awards and honors ==
- IEEE Fellow, 1990, "for contributions to geometric and nonlinear control and to engineering education"
- Outstanding Systems Engineering Faculty Award, Institute for Systems Research, University of Maryland (1990–1991, 2008–2009)
- Distinguished Faculty Research Fellow, University of Maryland (1998–2000)
- American Helicopter Society Grover E. Bell Award (team member), 2002, for work on smart structures at the Alfred Gessow Rotorcraft Research Center
- Munich Mathematical Colloquium Lecturer, October 2006
- Hendrik W. Bode Lecture Prize, IEEE Control Systems Society, 2007, "for fundamental contributions to the theory of control of natural and synthetic systems"
