= Bonnie Ferri =

American electrical engineer and academic administrator

Bonnie Heck Ferri is an American electrical engineer and academic administrator, the Vice Provost for Graduate and Postdoctoral Education at Georgia Tech, where she was the first woman to earn a Ph.D. in electrical engineering, and the first woman to join the faculty in the Department of Electrical and Computer Engineering. Her publications include work on engineering education and control theory, including control reconfiguration and distributed control systems.

== Education and career ==
Ferri majored in electrical engineering at the University of Notre Dame, graduating in 1981. After working in industry and taking a master's degree in mechanical and aerospace engineering at Princeton University, she came to Georgia Tech as a doctoral student in electrical engineering, where she completed her Ph.D. in 1988, the first woman there to earn a doctorate in electrical engineering.

She continued at Georgia Tech as an assistant professor, the first woman hired to a faculty position in electrical engineering. She was promoted to associate professor in 1995 and full professor in 2002.

She took her current position as vice provost (at the time Vice Provost for Graduate Education and Faculty Development) in 2017.

== Recognition ==
Ferri was the 2007 recipient of the Hewlett-Packard/Harriet B. Rigas Award of the IEEE Education Society. She was selected as the recipient of the John R. Ragazzini Award in 2022 and elected as an IEEE Fellow "for contributions to hands-on learning and leadership in higher education" in that same year.
