= Sonja Glavaški =

Electrical engineer

Sonja Glavaški is an electrical engineer. Initially focusing on nonlinear control and robust control, her interests have since shifted to include computational challenges in the control of electrical grids and their integration with building-scale energy systems. Educated in Serbia and the US, she works at the Pacific Northwest National Laboratory as Chief Energy Digitalization Scientist and Principal Technology Strategy advisor for the Energy & Environment Directorate.

== Education and career ==
Glavaški earned an engineering degree and master's degree in electrical engineering from the University of Belgrade. She continued her education at the California Institute of Technology, earning a second master's degree and completing her Ph.D. there. Her 1998 doctoral dissertation, Robust system analysis and nonlinear system model reduction, was supervised by John Doyle.

She worked in industry, becoming a principal scientist for Honeywell, at Honeywell Labs in Minneapolis, working for the Eaton Corporation at the Eaton Innovation Center in Wisconsin, and then for United Technologies at the United Technologies Research Center in Connecticut, where she led the Control Systems Group.

Next, she moved to ARPA-E, the US Advanced Research Projects Agency–Energy, as a program director in charge of projects including the Network Optimized Distributed Energy Systems (NODES) program, focusing on the integration of small-scale renewable energy sources into the grid and the use of building-scale energy systems for grid energy storage. She moved from there to her present position at the Pacific Northwest National Laboratory.

== Recognition ==
Glavaški was named an IEEE Fellow, in the 2020 class of fellows, "for leadership in energy systems".
