= Sundeep Rangan =

Professor of engineering

Sundeep Rangan is a professor at the New York University Tandon School of Engineering, where he also serves as an Associate Director of NYU Wireless. He was named Fellow of the Institute of Electrical and Electronics Engineers (IEEE) in 2016 for contributions to orthogonal frequency division multiple access cellular communication systems. Dr. Rangan received his B.A.Sc. at the University of Waterloo, Canada and the M.Sc. and Ph.D. (1997, under Kameshwar Poolla, with a thesis titled Validation, identification and control of robust control uncertainty models) at the University of California, Berkeley, all in Electrical Engineering. He has held postdoctoral appointments at the University of Michigan, Ann Arbor and Bell Labs. In 2000, he co-founded (with four others) Flarion Technologies, a spin off of Bell Labs, that developed Flash OFDM, the first cellular OFDM data system and precursor to 4G cellular systems including LTE and WiMAX. In 2006, Flarion was acquired by Qualcomm Technologies. Dr. Rangan was a Senior Director of Engineering at Qualcomm involved in OFDM infrastructure products. He joined the ECE department at NYU Tandon (formerly NYU Polytechnic) in 2010. His research interests are in wireless communications, signal processing, information theory and control theory.
