= John Baras =

Greek-American electrical engineer and mathematician

John S. Baras
- Born: Greece
- Education: National Technical University of Athens (Diploma); Harvard University (MS, PhD)
- Known for: Institute for Systems Research; Internet over satellite HughesNet algorithms
- Awards: IEEE Fellow (1984); IEEE Simon Ramo Medal (2017); Richard E. Bellman Control Heritage Award (2017)
- Scientific career
- Fields: Electrical engineering Applied mathematics Control theory Systems engineering
- Workplaces: University of Maryland, College Park; Royal Institute of Technology; Technical University of Munich
- Notable students: Xiaobo Tan

John S. Baras is a Greek-American electrical engineer and applied mathematician. He is a Distinguished University Professor and the Lockheed Martin Chair in Systems Engineering at the University of Maryland, College Park. He is the founding director of the Institute for Systems Research, one of the first six National Science Foundation Engineering Research Centers.

Baras is known for developing the algorithms and protocols that enabled broadband Internet over satellite, which led to the development of HughesNet and the creation of the Internet-over-satellite industry.

== Education ==
Baras received a Diploma in Electrical and Mechanical Engineering with highest honors from the National Technical University of Athens in 1970, where he was awarded the Ch. Chrysovergis Award as the outstanding graduating student from the Department of Electrical Engineering. He received an M.S. in 1971 and a Ph.D. in 1973, both in applied mathematics, from Harvard University.

== Career ==
Baras joined the University of Maryland in August 1973 as an assistant professor and rose through the ranks to full professor in 1982. In 1990, he was appointed to the endowed Lockheed Martin Chair in Systems Engineering. He was named Distinguished University Professor in 2018, the highest academic honor conferred by the University of Maryland.

From 1985 to 1991, Baras served as the founding director of the Institute for Systems Research (originally called the Systems Research Center), established as a joint venture between the University of Maryland and Harvard University. The institute was one of the original six NSF Engineering Research Centers created in 1985. Since 1992, he has been the founding director of the Maryland Center for Hybrid Networks (HyNet), an industry-university-government consortium focusing on hybrid wireless networks with support from the Department of Defense, NASA, and industry.

Baras holds visiting positions as Senior Research Scientist at the Royal Institute of Technology (KTH), Sweden, and the Technical University of Munich, Germany.

== Research ==
Baras's research interests include wireless networks, sensor networks, satellite communications, network security, stochastic systems, nonlinear control, and model-based systems engineering.

=== Internet over satellite ===
Baras developed the algorithms and protocols for broadband Internet service over satellite, introducing and demonstrating the first working broadband Internet-over-satellite protocol in 1994. His innovations included "splitting the connection," "address spoofing," and "selective acknowledgment" to optimize TCP performance over high-latency satellite links. This work, conducted through the Center for Satellite and Hybrid Communication Networks (now HyNet) which he co-founded with colleague Anthony Ephremides, earned the 1994 Outstanding Invention of the Year Award from the University of Maryland.

Baras's collaboration with Hughes Network Systems resulted in HughesNet, recognized as the largest-selling product ever developed with support from the Maryland Industrial Partnerships Program. His contributions enabled widespread satellite Internet connectivity for consumers, businesses, ships, aircraft, military networks, and rural and underdeveloped areas.

== Awards and honors ==
- IEEE Fellow, 1984, "for contributions to distributed parameter systems theory, quantum and nonlinear estimation, and control of queuing systems"
- George S. Axelby Prize, IEEE Control Systems Society, 1980
- Foreign Member, Royal Swedish Academy of Engineering Sciences, 2006
- IEEE Simon Ramo Medal, 2017, "for exceptional contributions to the conception and commercialization of Internet-over-satellite systems, and for leadership in model-based engineering, systems science, and engineering research"
- Richard E. Bellman Control Heritage Award, American Automatic Control Council, 2017, "for innovative contributions to control theory, stochastic systems, and networks and academic leadership in systems and control"
- AIAA Aerospace Communications Award, American Institute of Aeronautics and Astronautics, 2018
- Doctor Honoris Causa, National Technical University of Athens, 2018
- Fellow, American Mathematical Society, 2019, "for contributions to the mathematical foundations and applications of systems theory, stochastic systems, stochastic control, network security and trust, mentoring and academic leadership"
- Fellow, Society for Industrial and Applied Mathematics
- Fellow, American Association for the Advancement of Science
- Fellow, National Academy of Inventors
- Fellow, International Federation of Automatic Control
- Fellow, American Institute of Aeronautics and Astronautics, 2020
- A. James Clark School of Engineering Innovation Hall of Fame, 2016
