= Eric Feron =

American computer scientist

- Scientific career
- Thesis: Linear Matrix Inequalities for the Problem of Absolute Stability of Automatic Control
- Doctoral advisor: Stephen Boyd
- Website: http://www.feron.org/Eric/

Eric Marie Feron is a computer scientist and aerospace engineer. He has been the Dutton/Ducoffe Professor of Aerospace Software Engineering at Georgia Tech since 2005.

He taught at MIT's Department of Aeronautics and Astronautics from 1993 until his appointment at Georgia Tech. He obtained his BS from Ecole Polytechnique in 1989, his MS from Ecole Normale Suprieure in 1990, and PhD from Stanford University in 1994. His particular research foci are aerobatic control of unmanned aerial vehicles, multi-agent operations, including air traffic control systems and aerospace software system certification. One of his students at MIT was Selçuk Bayraktar, the designer of the Bayraktar TB2 drone.

== Selected research ==
- Frazzoli, Emilio, Munther A. Dahleh, and Eric Feron. "Maneuver-based motion planning for nonlinear systems with symmetries." IEEE Transactions on robotics 21.6 (2005): 1077–1091.
- Frazzoli, Emilio, Munther A. Dahleh, and Eric Feron. "Real-time motion planning for agile autonomous vehicles." Journal of Guidance, Control, and Dynamics 25.1 (2002): 116–129.
- Schouwenaars, Tom, et al. "Mixed integer programming for multi-vehicle path planning." 2001 European control conference (ECC). IEEE, 2001.
- Boyd, Stephen, et al. Linear matrix inequalities in system and control theory. Vol. 15. Siam, 1994.

== Published books ==
- Advances in Control System Technology for Aerospace Applications, Eric Feron (editor), 2016, Springer.
- General Theory of Algebraic Equations, Translate by Eric Feron, 2006, Princeton University Press.
- Linear Matrix Inequalities in System and Control Theory, Stephen Boyd, Laurent El Ghaoul, Eric Feron, 1994, Society for Industrial and Applied Mathematics.
