= Dawn Tilbury =

American mechanical engineer

Dawn Marie Tilbury is an American mechanical engineer and professor at the University of Michigan. Her field of research is in control theory.

== Education ==
Tilbury received a bachelor's degree with a major in electrical engineering at the University of Minnesota in 1989. She chose the subject because her father was an electrical engineer at Honeywell. As a student, she began her work in control theory with a summer internship at Honeywell involving thermostats.

She completed a Doctor of Philosophy in electrical engineering and computer science at the University of California, Berkeley in 1994. Her dissertation was titled Exterior differential systems and nonholonomic motion planning, and her doctoral supervisor was Shankar Sastry.

== Career ==
Tilbury joined the University of Michigan College of Engineering as an assistant professor in 1995. She was appointed associate professor in 2001 and full professor in 2007. At Michigan, she directed the Ground Robotics Reliability Center from 2009 to 2011 and served as the College of Engineering's associate dean for research from 2014 to 2016.

She served assistant director for engineering at the National Science Foundation from 2017 to 2021, retaining her professorship at the University of Michigan. At the American Automatic Control Council, she served as vice president for the 2020–2021 term and as president for the 2021–2022 and 2024–2025 terms.

On July 16, 2026, the Regents of the University of Michigan approved the appointment of Tilbury as the Martha E. Pollack Distinguished University Professor of Robotics, effective September 1, 2026.

== Recognition ==
Tilbury was named an IEEE Fellow in the class of 2009, affiliated with the IEEE Control Systems Society, "for leadership in networked and logic control systems". She was named a Fellow of the American Society of Mechanical Engineers (ASME) in 2012.

The American Automatic Control Council awarded Tilbury Donald P. Eckman Award in 2001, "for research exemplifying engineering aspects of control systems and for significant contributions to logic control and networked/distributed control". The Society of Women Engineers named her as the inaugural winner of their Distinguished Engineering Educator award in 2012. In 2014, the ASME gave her their biennial Michael J. Rabins Leadership Award.
