= Murat Arcak =

Turkish-American electrical engineer

Murat Arcak is a professor of electrical engineering and computer science from the University of California, Berkeley who was named Fellow of the Institute of Electrical and Electronics Engineers (IEEE) in 2012 for contributions to theory and application of nonlinear observer design and the passivity approach to control of distributed systems. In 2007 he was a recipient of the SIAG/Control and Systems Theory Prize from the Society for Industrial and Applied Mathematics of which he is also a member.

== Education ==
Murat Arcak obtained B.S. degree in electrical engineering from Boğaziçi University in 1996 and then got M.S. and Ph.D. degrees from the University of California, Santa Barbara in 1997 and 2000 respectively. He then worked in Rensselaer Polytechnic Institute.

== Honors and awards ==
- Arcak was awarded the IEEE Control Systems Society Antonio Ruberti Young Researcher Prize in 2014 "For contributions to the theory and applications of nonlinear control, stability and passivity".
