= John G. Truxal =

American control theorist (1924–2007)

- Born: February 19, 1924; Lancaster, Pennsylvania
- Died: February 16, 2007 (aged 82)
- Citizenship: American
- Education: Dartmouth College, MIT
- Awards: IEEE James H. Mulligan, Jr. Education Medal (1974); Rufus Oldenburger Medal (1991); Richard E. Bellman Control Heritage Award (1991)
- Scientific career
- Fields: Control theory, Systems engineering
- Workplaces: Purdue University, Polytechnic Institute of Brooklyn, Stony Brook University

John G. Truxal (February 19, 1924 - February 16, 2007) was an American control theorist and a Distinguished Teaching Professor, Emeritus at the State University of New York at Stony Brook. Truxal was a member of the National Academy of Engineering and is noted for his numerous contributions to control theory, for which he received the Richard E. Bellman Control Heritage Award (1991). He moved to the Polytechnic Institute of Brooklyn and became professor and chairman of the electrical engineering department there in 1957. Four years later, he was named vice president of the school, and held that position for 11 years.
