= Stephen P. Boyd =

American electrical engineer (born 1958)

- Born: February 1958 (age 68); Ann Arbor, Michigan, U.S.
- Education: Harvard University; University of California, Berkeley
- Known for: Convex optimization techniques
- Father: Julian C. Boyd
- Awards: 1992 AACC Donald P. Eckman Award; 2012 Beale-Orchard-Hays Award; 2013 IEEE Control Systems Award; National Academy of Engineering, inducted 2014; 2014 INFORMS Saul Gass Expository Writing Award; 2016 Walter J. Gores Award for Excellence in Teaching at Stanford; 2017 IEEE James H. Mulligan Jr. Education Medal
- Scientific career
- Fields: Control engineering; Electrical engineering
- Workplaces: Stanford University
- Thesis: Volterra Series: Engineering Fundamentals (1985)
- Doctoral advisor: Charles A. Desoer; S. Shankar Sastry; Leon Chua
- Doctoral students: Venkataramanan Balakrishnan; Mung Chiang; Eric Feron; Costis Maglaras

Stephen Poythress Boyd (born February, 1958) is an American electrical engineer and control theorist. He is the Samsung Professor of Engineering, Professor in Electrical Engineering, and professor by courtesy in Computer Science and Management Science & Engineering at Stanford University. He is also affiliated with Stanford's Institute for Computational and Mathematical Engineering (ICME).

In 2014, Boyd was elected a member of the National Academy of Engineering for contributions to engineering design and analysis via convex optimization.

== Academic biography ==
=== Early life and education ===
Boyd was born in Michigan and grew up in California. His father is Julian C. Boyd, a professor of English at University of California, Berkeley. His mother is Zelda A. Boyd, a professor at California State University, East Bay.

Boyd received a B.A. degree in mathematics, summa cum laude, from Harvard University in 1980, and a Ph.D. in electrical engineering and computer sciences from the University of California, Berkeley in 1985 under the supervision of Charles A. Desoer, S. Shankar Sastry and Leon Ong Chua. While at Berkeley, he was awarded a Hertz Fellowship (1982) and received the Hertz Thesis Prize (1985). In 2006 he was awarded an honorary doctorate from the Royal Institute of Technology in Stockholm, Sweden, and in 2017, from the Université catholique de Louvain in Belgium.

=== Career ===
Boyd joined the faculty of Stanford University's Electrical Engineering department in 1985. He regularly teaches undergraduate courses in applied linear algebra and machine learning. During his time at Stanford, he has been recognized with several teaching awards, including the 2016 Walter J. Gores Award for excellence in teaching, the school's highest teaching honor. He was awarded the 2017 IEEE James H. Mulligan Jr. Education Medal, in recognition of his efforts in education in the theory and application of optimization, which has sparked the writing of improved linear algebra and convex optimization textbooks. He has served as director of Stanford's Information Systems Laboratory, and as a visiting professor at universities including City University of Hong Kong, Massachusetts Institute of Technology, New York University, Royal Institute of Technology in Stockholm, and Katholieke Universiteit Leuven in Belgium. While at Stanford, he has consulted with numerous Silicon Valley tech companies, and founded one. His groups' CVXGEN software is used in SpaceX's Falcon 9 and Falcon Heavy to guide their autonomous precision landing.

=== Research ===
Boyd's primary research interests are convex optimization, especially applications in control, signal processing, machine learning, and finance. His PhD dissertation was on Volterra series descriptions of nonlinear circuits and devices. His primary focus then turned to automatic control systems, where he focused on applying convex optimization, specifically linear matrix inequalities (LMIs), to a variety of control system analysis and synthesis problems.

With Craig Barratt, he authored Linear Controller Design: Limits of Performance in 1991. In 1994, Boyd and Laurent El Ghaoui, Eric Feron, and Ragu Balakrishnan authored the book Linear Matrix Inequalities in System & Control Theory. Around 1999, he and Lieven Vandenberghe developed a PhD-level course and wrote the book Convex Optimization to introduce and apply convex optimization to other fields.

In 2005 he and Michael Grant developed the MATLAB open source software package CVX, which makes it easy to specify and solve convex optimization problems. This work earned them the 2012 Beale-Orchard-Hays Prize for Excellence in Computational Mathematical Programming. In 2012 he and Jacob Mattingley developed CVXGEN, which generates fast custom code for small, quadratic-programming-representable convex optimization problems, using an online interface. With minimal effort, it turns a mathematical problem description into a high-speed solver.

Open-source software packages developed by his research group are widely used and include:

- CVXPY,
- SCS, first-order primal-dual cone solver for large problems
- OSQP (with Oxford)

Boyd is ranked top 10 scientist in the field of Engineering and Technology.

=== Business and patents ===
Boyd co-founded and served as chief scientist of analog synthesis and intellectual property provider Barcelona Design, from its 1999 founding until it folded in 2005. He serves in an advisory capacity for BlackRock, an investment management corporation; Petuum, a machine learning platform for artificial intelligence; and H2O.ai, open source machine learning platform. He is also a co-inventor on 11 patents. On his personal website, which is visited more than 1.6 million times per year, he makes available papers, books, software, lecture notes and lecture videos.

== Awards and honors ==
- Hertz Foundation Fellow, 1980
- AACC Donald P. Eckman Award, 1992
- IEEE Fellow, 1999
- John R. Ragazzini Award, 2003
- Mathematical Optimization Society Beale-Orchard-Hays Award, 2012
- IEEE Control Systems Award, 2013
- Member, US National Academy of Engineering, inducted 2014
- 2014 INFORMS Saul Gass Expository Writing Award
- SIAM Fellow, 2015
- Walter J. Gores Award for Excellence in Teaching at Stanford, 2016
- INFORMS Fellow, 2016
- IEEE James H. Mulligan Jr. Education Medal, 2017
- Foreign Member, Chinese Academy of Engineering, 2017
- 2019 Athanasios Papoulis Award, EURASIP
- Foreign Member, National Academy of Engineering of Korea (NAEK), 2020

== Bibliography ==
- Introduction to Applied Linear Algebra - Vectors, Matrices, and Least Squares (Cambridge University Press, 2018) – with Lieven Vandenberghe (full book PDF by the authors)
- Convex Optimization (Cambridge University Press, 2004) – with Lieven Vandenberghe (full book PDF by the authors)
- Linear Matrix Inequalities in System and Control Theory (Society for Industrial and Applied Mathematics, 1994) – with Laurent El Ghaoui, Eric Feron and Vendataramanan Balakrishnan (full book PDF by the copyright holders)
- Linear Controller Design: Limits of Performance (Prentice Hall, 1991) – with Craig H. Barratt (full book PDF available from the authors)
