= Kyriakos G. Vamvoudakis =

- Vamvoudakis at the Georgia Institute of Technology
- Education: University of Texas at Arlington (PhD)
- Scientific career
- Fields: Control theory
- Institutions: Georgia Institute of Technology
- Thesis: Online Learning Algorithms for Differential Dynamic Games and Optimal Control
- Doctoral advisor: Frank L. Lewis
- Website: ae.gatech.edu/directory/person/kyriakos-g-vamvoudakis

Kyriakos G. Vamvoudakis is a control theorist and associate professor in the Daniel Guggenheim School of Aerospace Engineering at the Georgia Institute of Technology. His research focuses on reinforcement learning, optimal control, and adaptive dynamic programming applied to nonlinear and uncertain dynamical systems.

== Education ==
Vamvoudakis received a PhD in Electrical Engineering from the University of Texas at Arlington in 2011 under the supervision of Frank L. Lewis.

== Career ==
He has held academic positions at the University of Texas at Arlington, the University of California, Santa Barbara, and Virginia Tech. He joined the Georgia Institute of Technology in 2018 as a faculty member in aerospace engineering.

Vamvoudakis serves as co-Editor-in-Chief of Aerospace Science and Technology.
