= Lawrence Stark =

American neurologist

Lawrence W. Stark (February 21, 1926 – October 22, 2004) was an American neurologist and a recognized authority in the use of engineering analysis to characterize neurological systems. He was a longtime professor of physiological optics and engineering at the University of California, Berkeley. Stark was born to a Jewish family in Brooklyn, New York. His father Edward Stark was a chemical engineer trained at Massachusetts Institute of Technology, and Lawrence credited his early interest in engineering to him.

== Career ==
Stark graduated from Columbia University in 1945 with majors in English, biology, and zoology. He received his M.D. in 1948 from Albany Medical College. He worked at Oxford and Yale and as a doctor in the U.S. Navy during the Korean War. From 1960 to 1965, he was head of the neurology section in the Center for Communication Sciences at MIT. In 1965, he became chairman of the biomedical engineering department at the University of Illinois-Chicago. In 1968, he went to UC-Berkeley, where he remained until his retirement in 1994. An occasional conference on Vision and Movement in Man and Machine is held, and they are nicknamed Starkfest, according to conference organizer John Semmlow of Rutgers University, who was one of Stark's students at both UIC and Berkeley. Stark was a Guggenheim Fellow in 1968.

== Scientific contributions ==
Dr. Stark was best known for his research on the control of eye movements. He pioneered the application of Control Theory to neurological systems with his study in the 1950s and 1960s of the pupillary light reflex. He later studied the saccade (fast discrete changes of gaze) and the accommodation of the eye's focus.

He trained many Ph.D. students, primarily in the fields of bioengineering and physiological optics (better known as visual neuroscience). He advised David Reinkensmeyer at Berkeley.

== Personal life ==
Stark was the brother of civil rights activist Matthew Stark. Stark was married and divorced twice and had three daughters. He died in Berkeley in 2004 and is buried in Dutch Flat, California.
