= John Doyle (engineer) =

American technical engineer and professor

- Born: John Comstock Doyle
- Education: Massachusetts Institute of Technology (BS, MS); University of California, Berkeley (PhD)
- Known for: Doyle's catch
- Scientific career
- Institutions: California Institute of Technology
- Thesis: Matrix interpolation theory and optimal control (1984)
- Doctoral advisor: Donald Sarason
- Doctoral students: Sonja Glavaški; Irene Gregory; Na Li; Pablo Parrilo
- Website: www.cds.caltech.edu/~doyle/

John Comstock Doyle is an American control theorist is the Jean-Lou Chameau Professor of Control and Dynamical Systems, Electrical Engineering, and BioEngineering at the California Institute of Technology. His current research interests are in theoretical foundations for complex networks in engineering, biology, and multiscale physics.

== Education ==
He earned Bachelor of Science and Master of Science degrees in electrical engineering from the Massachusetts Institute of Technology in 1977 and a Ph.D. in mathematics from the University of California, Berkeley, in 1984 with his thesis titled Matrix interpolation theory and optimal control.

== Career ==
Doyle's early work was in the mathematics of robust control, linear-quadratic-Gaussian control robustness, (structured) singular value analysis, and H-infinity methods. He has co-authored books and software toolboxes, and a control analysis tool for high performance commercial and military aerospace systems, as well as other industrial systems.

== Doyle's catch ==
Doyle's catch refers to the latent difficulty in the deployment and adoption of autonomous system validated by simulations in the real world. Doyle and David L. Alderson described the idea in 2010.

The description of the difficulty is described by safety researcher David Woods as:

Computer-based simulation and rapid prototyping tools are now broadly available and powerful enough that it is relatively easy to demonstrate almost anything, provided that conditions are made sufficiently idealized. However, the real world is typically far from idealized, and thus a system must have enough robustness in order to close the gap between demonstration and the real thing.

== Awards ==
Doyle earned the IEEE W.R.G. Baker Prize Paper Award (1991), the IEEE Automatic Control Transactions Axelby Award twice, and the AACC Schuck award. He also has been awarded the AACC Donald P. Eckman Award, the 2004 IEEE Control Systems Award and the Centennial Outstanding Young Engineer Award.

== See also ==
- Ironies of Automation
- Goodhart's law
