= Irving Lefkowitz =

American engineer (1921–2015)

- Born: July 8, 1921; New York City
- Died: June 21, 2015 (aged 93); Charlottesville, Virginia
- Education: Case Western Reserve University
- Awards: Richard E. Bellman Control Heritage Award (1982)
- Scientific career
- Fields: Control theory

Irving Lefkowitz (July 8, 1921 – June 21, 2015) was an American control engineer and Professor Emeritus at the Case Western Reserve University who made significant contributions to process dynamics, advanced control, and computer-based integrated and hierarchical systems control. Lefkowitz was a Life Fellow of the IEEE Control Systems Society, and a recipient of the Richard E. Bellman Control Heritage Award (1982).

He began his career in the industry working for Seagram, first in Baltimore, and later in Louisville, where he became director of corporate instrumentation and control research.
