= Linda Bushnell =

American expert on networked control systems

Linda Grace Bushnell is an American expert on networked control systems who works as a research professor of electrical and computer engineering at the University of Washington and as a program director for the Civic Innovation Challenge (CIVIC) and Cyber-Physical Systems (CPS) programs at the National Science Foundation.

== Education and career ==
Bushnell majored in electrical engineering at the University of Connecticut, where she earned a bachelor's degree in 1985 and a master's degree in 1987. After earning a second master's degree in mathematics at the University of California, Berkeley in 1989, she completed a Ph.D. in electrical engineering and computer science at UC Berkeley in 1994. Her dissertation, Motion Planning for Wheeled Nonholonomic Systems, was supervised by Shankar Sastry. She also has an MBA, earned in 2010 through the Foster School of Business at the University of Washington.

After completing her Ph.D., she worked as a program manager in the Army Research Office of the United States Army Research Laboratory from 1994 to 2000, while also holding an adjunct associate professor position at Duke University. She moved to the University of Washington in 2000.

== Recognition ==
Bushnell is a Fellow of the IEEE and a Fellow of the International Federation of Automatic Control, elected in 2020 "for contributions to the analysis and design of networked control systems".
