= Jose B. Cruz Jr. =

American engineer

- Born: September 17, 1932 (age 93); Malolos, Bulacan, Philippines
- Citizenship: American
- Awards: Richard E. Bellman Control Heritage Award (1994); IEEE James H. Mulligan Jr. Education Medal (2009)
- Scientific career
- Fields: Control theory

Jose Bejar Cruz Jr. (born September 17, 1932) is a noted control theorist and a Distinguished Professor of Engineering in the Department of Electrical and Computer Engineering, Ohio State University.

Cruz was elected a member of the National Academy of Engineering in 1980 for contributions to the control of large-scale systems with multiple goals and to sensitivity analysis. He is also a Fellow of the American Association for the Advancement of Science, the Institute of Electrical and Electronics Engineers, the International Federation of Automatic Control, and the American Society for Engineering Education. He is also the recipient of the IEEE Centennial Medal in 1984, the Richard E. Bellman Control Heritage Award in 1994, and the IEEE James H. Mulligan, Jr. Education Medal in 2009.

== Early life and education ==
He is a native of the town of Malolos, the capital of the province of Bulacan in the Philippines. He completed his secondary studies at the Bulacan Provincial High School in his native town. He then went to the University of the Philippines, Diliman, Quezon City, Philippines, for his college studies. There, he completed his BS in electrical engineering, summa cum laude, in 1953, the first recipient of such an honor from the university. The following year, he journeyed to the US and earned an MS in electrical engineering from the MIT in Cambridge. Subsequently, he got his PhD in electrical engineering from the University of Illinois, Urbana, Illinois. He has spent most of his adult life in the US.

== Biography ==
- Ph.D. in electrical engineering, University of Illinois Urbana, IL, October 1959
- S.M. in electrical engineering, Massachusetts Institute of Technology Cambridge, MA, June 1956
- B.S. in electrical engineering, summa cum laude University of the Philippines Quezon City, April 1953
