= Hana El-Samad =

Lebanese-American scientist

- Born: Lebanon
- Education: American University of Beirut; Iowa State University; University of California, Santa Barbara
- Scientific career
- Workplaces: University of California, San Francisco
- Thesis: Biological design principles for robustness, performance and selective interactions with noise : he E. coli heat shock response and other case studies. (2004)

Hana El-Samad is a Lebanese-American scientist who is a founding Principal Investigator at Altos Labs and a Professor of Biochemistry and Biophysics at the University of California, San Francisco. Her work considers control theory and the function of complex biological systems. Her group has made contributions to systems biology, synthetic biology, and cell engineering.

In November 2021, El-Samad was appointed as the Editor-in-Chief of GEN Biotechnology, a peer-reviewed scientific journal that launched in February 2022 publishing original research and perspectives across all facets of the biotechnology industry by Mary Ann Liebert, Inc.

== Early life and education ==
El-Samad grew up in Lebanon. She was one of four girls. Her mother was a math teacher and her father worked in retail. El-Samad was an undergraduate student at the American University of Beirut, where she studied the concepts of mathematical modeling. She became interested in control theory and moved to the United States as a graduate student at Iowa State University. El-Samad eventually obtained her doctorate in Mechanical Engineering at the University of California, Santa Barbara under the supervision of Mustafa Khammash. For her doctoral research she studied control theory, and how systems such as robots and cruise control handled sudden changes. She became increasingly interested in the complexity of biological systems, and switched her research focus to gene regulatory systems and the shock responses that bacteria undergo when adapting to temperature changes. After graduating, El-Samad was appointed as a Sandler Fellow at the University of California, San Francisco (UCSF).

== Research and career ==
El-Samad was appointed to the faculty at the University of California, San Francisco. In 2013 she was awarded a $1.4 million grant from the Paul Allen Family Foundation to study cellular networks. These cellular networks rely on rapid communication and information transfer. Temperature variations of 2 °C can cause considerable changes in the information sent from a cell to a gene. Specifically, El-Samad has studied how these changes are encoded within cells, such that the correct information is shared with genes. El-Samad studies the Protein kinase A (PKA) system, which is able to transient several environmental signals.

== Awards and honors ==
- 2011 American Automatic Control Council Donald P. Eckman Award
- 2008 University of California, San Francisco Grace Boyer Junior Faculty Endowed Chair
- 2009 David and Lucile Packard Foundation Packard Fellowship
- 2011 American Automatic Control Council Donald P. Eckman Award

== Selected publications ==
- Wenzhe Ma; Ala Trusina; Hana El-Samad; Wendell A Lim; Chao Tang (1 August 2009). "Defining network topologies that can achieve biochemical adaptation". Cell. 138 (4): 760–773. doi:10.1016/j.cell.2009.06.013. ISSN 0092-8674. PMC 3068210. PMID 19703401. Wikidata Q29999690.
- Roshanak Irannejad; Jin C Tomshine; Jon R Tomshine; et al. (20 March 2013). "Conformational biosensors reveal GPCR signalling from endosomes". Nature. 495 (7442): 534–538. Bibcode:2013Natur.495..534I. doi:10.1038/nature12000. ISSN 1476-4687. PMC 3835555. PMID 23515162. Wikidata Q30557505.
- David Pincus; Michael W Chevalier; Tomas Aragon; Eelco van Anken; Simon E Vidal; Hana El-Samad; Peter Walter (6 July 2010). "BiP binding to the ER-stress sensor Ire1 tunes the homeostatic behavior of the unfolded protein response". PLOS Biology. 8 (7) e1000415. doi:10.1371/journal.pbio.1000415. ISSN 1544-9173. PMC 2897766. PMID 20625545. Wikidata Q33631257.

== Personal life ==
El-Samad is one of four girls. One of her sisters is an engineer, one a biologist and one a literature teacher.
