= Kameshwar Poolla =

Indian American professor of mechanical engineering

- Education: University of Florida, Indian Institute of Technology Bombay
- Known for: Control Theory, Economics, Energy Systems, Electricity Market
- Scientific career
- Workplaces: UC Berkeley
- Doctoral advisor: Pramod Khargonekar
- Doctoral students: Sundeep Rangan
- Website: www.eecs.berkeley.edu/Faculty/Homepages/poolla.html

Kameshwar Poolla is the Cadence Design Systems Distinguished Professor, in Department of Electrical Engineering & Computer Sciences, and Department of Mechanical Engineering at University of California, Berkeley. He received his B.Tech. degree from the Indian Institute of Technology, Bombay in 1980 and his Ph.D. from the Center for Mathematical System Theory, University of Florida, Gainesville in 1984.

== Career ==
From 1984 to 1991, he was a member of the faculty at the Department of Electrical and Computer Engineering at the University of Illinois Urbana-Champaign. He moved the University of California, Berkeley in 1991, and is currently Professor in the Departments of Mechanical Engineering and Electrical Engineering and Computer Sciences.

Poolla's current research interests include many aspects of future energy systems including economics, security, and commercialization.

== Patents ==
Poolla has been awarded 6 patents:

- Data collection and correction methods and apparatus
- Methods of and apparatuses for controlling process profiles
- Sensor geometry correction methods and apparatus
- Methods and apparatus for deriving thermal flux data for processing a workpiece
- Methods and apparatus for equipment matching and characterization
- Methods and apparatus for low distortion parameter measurements

== Awards ==
Poolla was awarded the 1984 Outstanding Dissertation Award by the University of Florida; the 1988 NSF Presidential Young Investigator Award; the 1993 Hugo Schuck Best Paper Prize; the 1994 Donald P. Eckman Award; a 1997 JSPS Fellowship; the 1997 Distinguished Teaching Award from the University of California, Berkeley; and the 2004 and 2007 IEEE Transactions on Semiconductor Manufacturing Best Paper Prizes; and the 2009 IEEE CSS Transition to Practice Award.
