= René Vidal (engineer) =

Chilean computer scientist (born 1974)

Rene Vidal
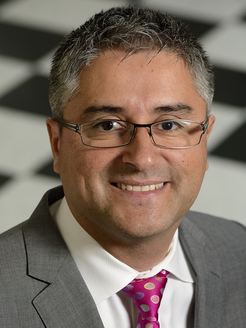
- Born: 1974 (age 51–52); Lautaro, Chile
- Education: Universidad Catolica de Chile; University of California, Berkeley
- Awards: ACM Fellow (2022); Edward J. McCluskey Technical Achievement Award (2021); AIMBE Fellow (2020); IAPR Fellow (2016); IEEE Fellow (2014); IAPR Aggarwal Prize (2012); Sloan Fellow (2009); ONR Young Investigator Award (2009); NSF CAREER Award (2004)
- Scientific career
- Fields: Machine learning Computer vision Medical Image Computing; Robotics; Control theory
- Workplaces: University of Pennsylvania; Johns Hopkins University
- Thesis: Generalized Principal Component Analysis (GPCA): An Algebraic Geometric Approach to Subspace Clustering and Motion Segmentation (2003)
- Doctoral advisor: S. Shankar Sastry
- Website: www.cis.jhu.edu/~rvidal/

René Vidal (born 1974) is a Chilean electrical engineer and computer scientist who is known for his research in machine learning, computer vision, medical image computing, robotics, and control theory. He is the Rachleff University Professor at the University of Pennsylvania, with joint appointments in the Department of Electrical and Systems Engineering in the School of Engineering and Applied Science and the Department of Radiology in the Perelman School of Medicine. He is also the founding director of the Center for Innovation in Data Engineering and Science (IDEAS).

== Biography ==
Vidal did his undergraduate studies at the Pontificia Universidad Catolica de Chile where he received his Bachelor of Science degree in 1995 and his Master of Engineering degree in 1996. After one year at DICTUC he enrolled at the University of California, Berkeley, where he was awarded an M.Sc. and a Ph.D. in Electrical Engineering and Computer Science in 2000 and 2003, respectively. Before joining Johns Hopkins University in 2004, he was a Research Scientist at the Australian National University and NICTA. From 2004 to 2022, he was a Professor in the Department of Biomedical Engineering of Johns Hopkins University with secondary appointments in Applied Mathematics and Statistics, Computer Science, Electrical and Computer Engineering, and Mechanical Engineering. He was also a faculty member in the Center for Imaging Science, the Institute for Computational Medicine and the Laboratory for Computational Sensing and Robotics. In 2017, Vidal became the founding director of the Mathematical Institute for Data Science (MINDS). In 2023 Vidal became the Rachleff University Professor in the Department of Electrical and Systems Engineering in the School of Engineering and Applied Science and the Department of Radiology in the Perelman School of Medicine of the University of Pennsylvania, where he is also the founding director of the Center for Innovation in Data Engineering and Science (IDEAS).

== Honors and awards ==
In 2004, Vidal was recognized with the National Science Foundation CAREER Awards. In 2009, Vidal was recognized by the Office of Naval Research with an award from the Young Investigator Program. In 2009, Vidal was recognized with a Sloan Research Fellowship in computer science by the Alfred P. Sloan Foundation. In 2012, Vidal was recognized by the International Association for Pattern Recognition by winning the J.K. Aggarwal Prize for outstanding contributions to generalized principal component analysis (GPCA) and subspace clustering in computer vision and pattern recognition. In 2014, Vidal was elected IEEE Fellow for contributions to subspace clustering and motion segmentation in computer vision. In 2016, Vidal was elected IAPR fellow for contributions to computer vision and pattern recognition. In 2020, Vidal was inducted into AIMBE College of Fellows for outstanding contributions to medical image analysis and medical robotics. In 2021, he received the Edward J. McCluskey Technical Achievement Award for “pioneering contributions to subspace clustering and generalized principal component analysis with applications in computer vision and pattern recognition.” In 2022, he was named to the 2022 class of ACM Fellows, "for contributions to subspace clustering and motion segmentation in computer vision".

== Work ==
Vidal has been a prominent scientist in the fields of machine learning, computer vision, medical image computing, robotics and control theory since the 2000s. In machine learning, Vidal has made many contributions to subspace clustering, including his work on Generalized Principal Component Analysis (GPCA), Sparse Subspace Clustering (SSC) and Low Rank Subspace Clustering (LRSC). Much of his work in machine learning is summarized in his book Generalized Principal Component Analysis. Currently, he is working on understanding the mathematical foundations of deep learning, specifically conditions for global optimality. In computer vision, Vidal has made many contributions to rigid motion segmentation, activity recognition and dynamic textures. In medical image computing, Vidal developed algorithms for recognition of surgical gestures. In robotics, Vidal developed algorithms for distributed control of unmanned vehicles. In control theory, Vidal studied algebraic conditions for observability of hybrid systems and algebraic geometric approaches for identification of hybrid systems.
