= Jeff S. Shamma =

American control theorist

- Born: New York City
- Education: Massachusetts Institute of Technology; Georgia Institute of Technology
- Awards: Donald P. Eckman Award
- Scientific career
- Fields: Control theory Game theory Robotics
- Workplaces: King Abdullah University of Science and Technology; Georgia Institute of Technology
- Doctoral advisor: Michael Athans

Jeff S. Shamma (born c. 1961) is an American control theorist. He is the Department Head and Professor of Industrial and Enterprise Systems Engineering at the University of Illinois Urbana-Champaign. Formerly, he was a Professor of Electrical engineering at the King Abdullah University of Science and Technology. Before that, he held the Julian T. Hightower Chair in Systems & Control Systems and Controls at the Georgia Institute of Technology. He is known for his early work in nonlinear and adaptive control, particularly on gain scheduling, robust control, and more recently, distributed systems.

== Early life and education ==
Shamma was born in New York City and raised in Pensacola, Florida. He received a B.S. in Mechanical Engineering from Georgia Tech in 1983 and a Ph.D. in Systems Science and Engineering from the Department of Mechanical Engineering at the Massachusetts Institute of Technology in 1988. His Ph.D. thesis, Analysis and Design of Gain Scheduled Control Systems, was advised by Michael Athans.

== Academic career ==
After graduating from MIT, Shamma held faculty positions at the University of Minnesota, Minneapolis, University of Texas, Austin, and University of California, Los Angeles. He also held visiting positions at the California Institute of Technology and MIT. Shamma returned to Georgia Tech to join the School of Electrical and Computer Engineering in 2007, and held the Julian T. Hightower Chair in Systems & Control Systems and Controls. In 2014, he moved to the King Abdullah University of Science and Technology. Shamma was a Professor of Electrical Engineering and Director of the Center of Excellence for NEOM Research at the King Abdullah University of Science and Technology, where he was also the Principal Investigator of the Robotics, Intelligent Systems & Control laboratory. Since 2020, he has been the Department Head and a Professor of Industrial and Enterprise Systems Engineering at the University of Illinois Urbana-Champaign.

== Awards ==
Shamma is a recipient of the NSF Research Initiation Award and the NSF Young Investigator Award. He received the American Automatic Control Council Donald P. Eckman Award in 1996 (32 years after his Ph.D. advisor Michael Athans received the award in 1964), and was made an IEEE Fellow in 2006.
