= Julian C. Boyd =

American linguist (1931–2005)

- Born: December 25, 1931; Orlando, Florida, U.S.
- Died: April 5, 2005 (aged 73); Berkeley, California, U.S.
- Children: 2, including Stephen

Academic background
- Education: Williams College (B.A.); University of Michigan (M.A., Ph.D.)
- Thesis: Deep and Surface Structure in the Accusative and Infinitive Expressions in Modern English (1965)
- Influences: J. L. Austin; John Searle; Noam Chomsky

Academic work
- Institutions: University of California, Berkeley

Julian Charles Boyd (December 25, 1931 – April 5, 2005) was an American linguist, reputed for his expertise on modality in English, as well as for his pedagogical excellence at the University of California, Berkeley, where he spent most of his academic career.

Boyd was born in Orlando and raised in Bogalusa on the Louisiana Gulf Coast. Beginning his undergraduate education at Georgetown University, he transferred after two years to Williams College, where he graduated with a B.A. in English in 1952. He continued his studies in English language and literature at the University of Michigan, Ann Arbor, receiving an M.A. in 1954 and a Ph.D. in 1965, with a thesis on Deep and Surface Structure in the Accusative and Infinitive Expressions in Modern English. In 1964, he joined the English faculty at Berkeley and remained there for the rest of his career, although he also taught at the nearby Graduate Theological Union during the 1970s and 80s.

Boyd joined the Berkeley faculty in the 1960s, a period of intense interest in linguistics during which many scholars hoped the field would provide the humanities with a "scientific" basis. The department attracted students and faculty from continental Europe, Britain, and the United States, including Noam Chomsky, the visiting Beckman Professor in 1966, whose transformational linguistics Boyd found deeply appealing in its philosophical implications. Boyd would retain his philosophical bent throughout his career, an emphasis supported by his interest in 17th century British literature. He preferred to be called a "philosophical grammarian" rather than a linguist and aligned himself with the British analytical tradition of speech act theory, as inspired by J. L. Austin and John Searle. Searle, a professor in the Berkeley Philosophy Department, and Boyd developed a close association in their thinking, teaching, and writing.

Boyd's analyses were guided by the belief that ordinary language embodies some of the deepest problems of philosophy, especially in the field of modal logic. He concentrated on the everyday uses of English as a subject worthy of rigorous study. His best-known work dealt with the usages of auxiliary verbs that assist main verbs in expressing shades of time and mood, such as the proper distinction between "shall" and "will". This led to his being called to testify as an expert witness on semantic issues in around 40 court cases, including murder trials. Among his numerous publications, his most important essays were "The Semantics of Modal Verbs", "Shall and Will", and "The Act in Question" (the former two co-written with J. P. Thorne and Zelda Boyd, respectively), in addition to collections he edited on Speech Act Theory: Ten Years Later and Meaning. Boyd also coauthored the 12 volume Roberts English Series of readers for grades 3–9, adopted by schools throughout the United States.

In 1993, Boyd won the university's Distinguished Teaching Award, based on superb evaluations from students, for his managing to demand high intellectual standards while maintaining a friendly rapport with his pupils. Chosen to deliver the commencement address the following year, he declared, "The so-called Great Conversation [of humanity] is indeed endless, not in the sense of endlessly repetitive, but in the sense of endlessly creative in exactly the way that Chomsky characterizes language itself – that is, as making infinite use of finite means." He belonged to the Linguistic Society of America, Modern Language Association, American Philosophical Association, The Mind Society, Berkeley Linguistic Society, Philological Association of the Pacific Coast, Semiotic Society of America and the Semiotic Circle, and beyond academia, was a tirelessly active member of Alcoholics Anonymous for 25 years. Boyd became a Professor Emeritus upon retiring in 1994 but continued to teach frequently at Berkeley, his last subject being a correspondence course on the history of the English language through the University Extension School, until his death from lung cancer at his Berkeley home in April 2005.

Boyd is survived by his wife, Melanie Lewis; and two sons, Stephen Boyd, a professor of electrical engineering at Stanford University and Michael Boyd.

== Selected publications ==
- Boyd, Julian; Thorne, J. P. (1969), "The Semantics of Modal Verbs", Journal of Linguistics, 5: 57–74, doi:10.1017/S002222670000205X, S2CID 143681787.
- Boyd, Julian; Boyd, Zelda (1980), "Shall and Will", in Leonard Michaels & Christopher Ricks (ed.), The State of the Language, Berkeley: University of California Press, pp. 43–53
- Boyd, Julian (1992), "The Act in Question", in Herman Parret & Jef Verschueren (ed.), (On) Searle on Conversation, Amsterdam & Philadelphia: J. Benjamins Pub. Co., pp. 31–34
