= Antonio Ruberti =

Italian politician and engineer

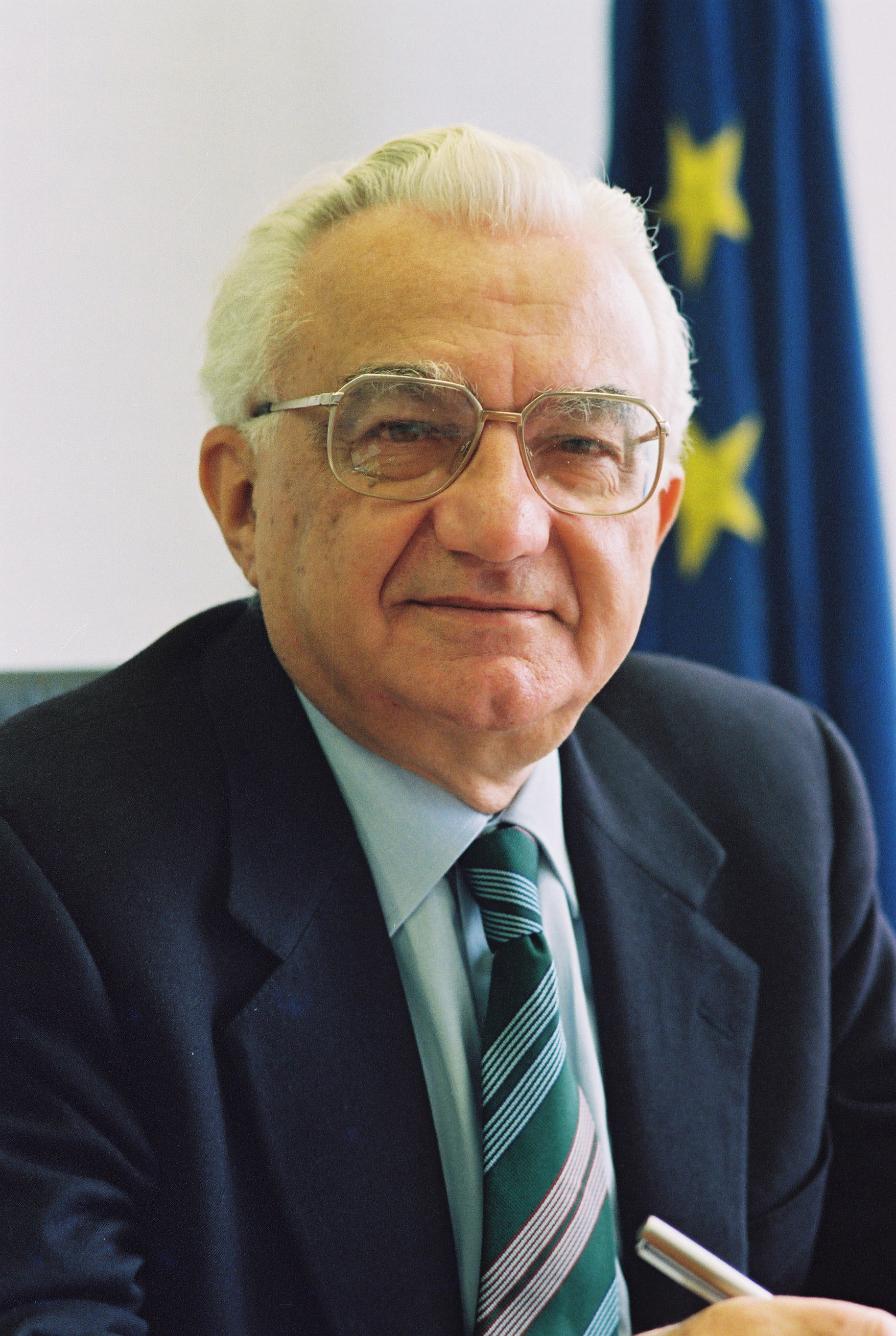
- Ruberti in 1993

Vice-President of the European Commission
- In office 5 January 1993 – 23 January 1995 Serving with Martin Bangemann, Leon Brittan, Henning Christophersen, Manuel Marín and Karel Van Miert
- President: Jacques Delors

European Commissioner for Science, Research, Technological Development, Education, Training and Youth
- In office 5 January 1993 – 23 January 1995
- President: Jacques Delors
- Preceded by: Filippo Maria Pandolfi
- Succeeded by: Édith Cresson

Minister of University and Scientific Research of Italy
- In office 29 July 1987 – 28 June 1992
- Prime Minister: Giovanni Goria; Ciriaco De Mita; Giulio Andreotti
- Preceded by: Luigi Granelli
- Succeeded by: Alessandro Fontana

Personal details
- Born: 24 January 1927 Aversa, Italy
- Died: 4 September 2000 (aged 73) Rome, Italy
- Party: Italian Socialist Party

Antonio Ruberti (24 January 1927 – 4 September 2000) was an Italian politician and engineer. He was a member of the Italian Government and a European Commissioner as well as a professor of engineering at La Sapienza University.

== Biography ==
Antonio Ruberti was born in Aversa in the province of Caserta, Campania. He received his degree in Engineering from the University of Naples Federico II.

He worked as a research engineer at Fondazione Ugo Bordoni since 1954 and taught control engineering and systems theory as the first head (1969) of the Department of Control Systems of La Sapienza University in Rome. During 1973-1976 Ruberti headed the Faculty of Science and Engineering of La Sapienza; later he has been Rector (1976-1987) at the same university.

In 1987, he joined the Italian government as Minister for the Coordination of Scientific and Technological Research. He held this position for five years.

In 1992 Ruberti was elected to the Chamber of Deputies among the ranks of the Italian Socialist Party, where he sat until 1993, when he was appointed by the Italian government to the European Commission chaired by Delors with the portfolio covering science, research, technological development and education. Ruberti was only a commissioner until 1995 but during this short mandate, he launched a series of new initiatives including the Socrates and Leonardo da Vinci programmes, the European Week of Scientific Culture, and the European Science and Technology Forum. After leaving the commission, Ruberti was once more elected to the Chamber of Deputies, where he chaired the Committee for European Union Policies.

He died in Rome in 2000. At his death's time, Ruberti was commended by Philippe Busquin for his passion and his commitment in European research policy as fervent European.

In Ruberti's memory, the IEEE CSS Society of Engineers established a prize for young researchers in 2005.
