= Stefano Soatto =

Italian computer scientist

- Born: Padua, Italy
- Education: California Institute of Technology
- Known for: Dynamic Vision
- Awards: Marr Prize, ICRA Best Paper Award, Siemens Prize
- Scientific career
- Fields: Computer Vision, Machine Learning, Robotics
- Workplaces: University of California, Los Angeles
- Thesis: A Geometric Framework for Dynamic Vision (1996)
- Doctoral advisor: Pietro Perona
- Other academic advisors: Roger Brockett, Giorgio Picci
- Website: www.cs.ucla.edu/~soatto

Stefano Soatto is professor of computer science at the University of California, Los Angeles (UCLA), in Los Angeles, CA, where he is also professor of electrical engineering and founding director of the UCLA Vision Lab. He is also Vice President of applied science for Amazon Web Services' (AWS) AI division.

== Academic biography ==
Soatto obtained his D. Eng. in electrical engineering, cum laude, from the University of Padua in 1992, was an EAP Fellow at the University of California, Berkeley in 1990–1991, and received his Ph.D. in control and dynamical systems from the California Institute of Technology in 1996 with dissertation "A Geometric Approach to Dynamic Vision". In 1996–97 he was a postdoctoral scholar at Harvard University, and subsequently held positions as assistant and associate professor of electrical engineering and biomedical engineering at Washington University in St. Louis, and of mathematics and computer science at the University of Udine, Italy. He has been at UCLA since 2000. He is also Vice President of applied science for Amazon Web Services' (AWS) AI division.

== Research ==
Soatto's research focuses on computer vision, machine learning and robotics. He co-developed optimal algorithms for structure from motion (SFM, or visual SLAM, simultaneous localization and mapping, in robotics; Best Paper Award at CVPR 1998), characterized its ambiguities (David Marr Prize at ICCV 1999), also characterized the identifiability and observability of visual-inertial sensor fusion (Best Paper Award at ICRA 2015). His research focus is the development of representations, that are functions of the data that capture their informative content and discard irrelevant variability in the data (a generalized form of 'noise' or 'clutter'). Soatto's lab first to demonstrate real-time SFM and augmented reality (AR) on commodity hardware in live demos at CVPR 2000, ICCV 2001, and ECCV 2002. He also co-led the UCLA-Golem Team in the second DARPA Grand Challenge for autonomous vehicles, with Emilio Frazzoli (co-founder of NuTonomy), and Amnon Shashua (co-founder of Mobileye).

== Recognition ==
Soatto was named Fellow of the Institute of Electrical and Electronics Engineers (IEEE) in 2013 for contributions to dynamic visual processes. He received the David Marr Prize in Computer Vision in 1999. He was named to the 2022 class of ACM Fellows, "for contributions to the foundations and applications of visual geometry and visual representations learning".
