= American Automatic Control Council =

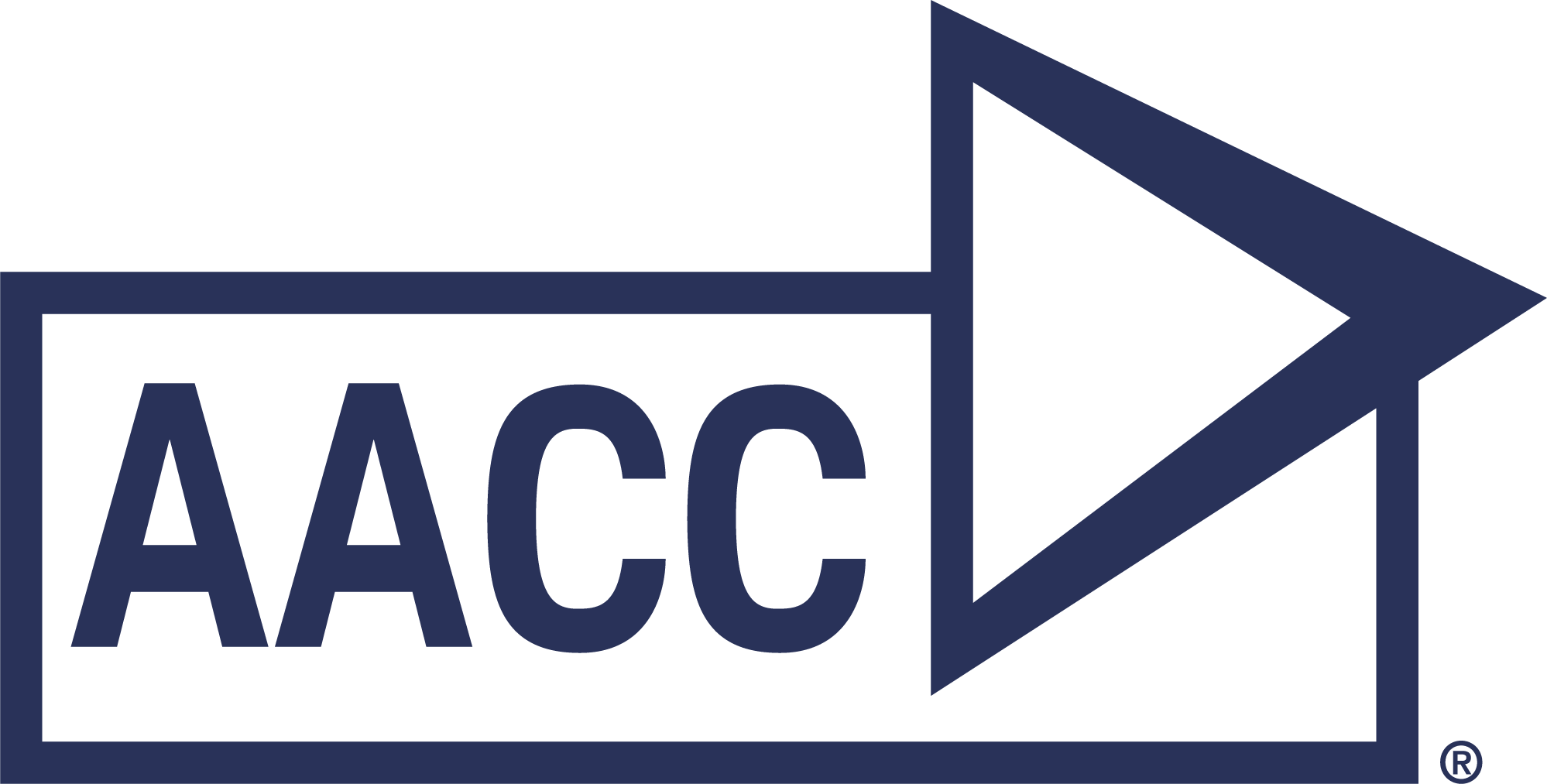
- Founded: 1957
- Type: Professional Organization
- Purpose: Control theory
- Origins: Association of the control systems divisions of nine societies.
- Region served: Worldwide
- Method: Conferences, Publications
- Key people: Robert Judd (current president)

The American Automatic Control Council (AACC) is an organization founded in 1957 for research in control theory. AACC is a member of the International Federation of Automatic Control (IFAC) and is an association of the control systems divisions of nine member societies:

- American Institute of Aeronautics and Astronautics (AIAA)
- American Institute of Chemical Engineers (AIChE)
- American Society of Civil Engineers (ASCE)
- American Society of Mechanical Engineers (ASME)
- Institute of Electrical and Electronics Engineers (IEEE)
- International Society of Automation (ISA)
- Society for Computer Simulation (SCS)
- Society for Industrial and Applied Mathematics (SIAM)
- Applied Probability Society (APS)

== American Control Conference ==
The American Control Conference (ACC) is an annual research conference sponsored by the AACC and is one of the most prestigious conferences in the field of control theory. Dating back to 1960, the attendees of the ACC are about 50% from the Americas and about 50% from other countries, consisting mostly of researchers with a large portion being students.

== Awards ==
The AACC issues five awards for achievements in control theory:

- Richard E. Bellman Control Heritage Award
- Babatunde Ogunnaike Control Practice Award
- Donald P. Eckman Award
- John R. Ragazzini Award
- O. Hugo Schuck Award
