= List of people in systems and control =

This is an alphabetical list of people who have made significant contributions in the fields of system analysis and control theory.

== Eminent researchers ==
The eminent researchers (born after 1920) include the winners of at least one award of the IEEE Control Systems Award, the Giorgio Quazza Medal, the Hendrik W. Bode Lecture Prize, the Richard E. Bellman Control Heritage Award, the Rufus Oldenburger Medal, or higher awards such as the IEEE Medal of Honor and the National Medal of Science. The earlier pioneers such as Nicolas Minorsky (1885–1970), Harry Nyquist (1889–1976), Harold Locke Hazen (1901–1980), Charles Stark Draper (1901–1987), Hendrik Wade Bode (1905–1982), Gordon S. Brown (1907–1996), John F. Coales (1907–1999), Rufus Oldenburger (1908–1969), John R. Ragazzini (1912–1988), Nathaniel B. Nichols (1914–1997), John Zaborszky (1914–2008) and Harold Chestnut (1917–2001) are not included.

Name	Institution	Nationality	Contributions	Age	Awards
Brian D. O. Anderson	Australian National University	Australian		1941	Hendrik W. Bode Lecture Prize (1992), IEEE Control Systems Award (1997), Giorgio Quazza Medal (1999)
Karl Johan Åström	Lund University	Swedish	Author of five books, including Introduction to Stochastic Control Theory (1970 and Dover, 2006) and (with Wittenmark) of Adaptive Control (Addison-Wesley, 1995).	1934	Rufus Oldenburger Medal (1985), Giorgio Quazza Medal (1988), IEEE Control Systems Award (1990)
Michael Athans (Μιχαήλ Αθανασιάδης)	Massachusetts Institute of Technology	Greek-American		1937	Hendrik W. Bode Lecture Prize (1993), Richard E. Bellman Control Heritage Award (1995)
John Baillieul	Boston University	American	Works on robotics, mechanical system control and non-holonomic constraints.	1945	Hendrik W. Bode Lecture Prize (2011)
B. Ross Barmish	University of Wisconsin–Madison	Canadian-American	Author of New Tools for Robustness of Linear Systems (Macmillan, 1994). For fundamental contributions to the analysis of systems with parametric uncertainty and to probabilistic robustness, and for contributions to the design of stock-trading algorithms that are robust to market variability. IEEE fellow and IFAC fellow.	1949	Hendrik W. Bode Lecture Prize (2013)
Tamer Başar	University of Illinois at Urbana–Champaign	Turkish-American	Works on dynamic games, control and communication theory, etc.	1946	Hendrik W. Bode Lecture Prize (2004), Giorgio Quazza Medal (2005), Richard E. Bellman Control Heritage Award (2006), IEEE Control Systems Award (2014)
Richard E. Bellman	University of Southern California	American		1920–1984	John von Neumann Theory Prize (1976), IEEE Medal of Honor (1979), Richard E. Bellman Control Heritage Award (1984)
Dimitri P. Bertsekas (Δημήτρης Παντελής Μπερτσεκάς)	Massachusetts Institute of Technology	Greek-American		1942–2026	Richard E. Bellman Control Heritage Award (2014), John von Neumann Theory Prize (2018), IEEE Control Systems Award (2022)
Stephen P. Boyd	Stanford University	American	Works on engineering applications of convex optimization. Winner of John R. Ragazzini Award in control systems.	1958	IEEE Control Systems Award (2013)
Roger W. Brockett	Harvard University	American	Works on dynamics and control of smart structures.	1938	Richard E. Bellman Control Heritage Award (1989), IEEE Control Systems Award (1991), Rufus Oldenburger Medal (2005), Giorgio Quazza Medal (2017)
Arthur E. Bryson, Jr.	Stanford University	American		1925	Rufus Oldenburger Medal (1980), IEEE Control Systems Award (1984), Richard E. Bellman Control Heritage Award (1990)
Peter E. Caines	McGill University	Canadian	Works in the areas of stochastic, adaptive, large scale and hybrid systems, Mean Field Games (or Nash Certainty Equivalence). Fellow of the IEEE, SIAM, the Institute of Mathematics and its Applications, the Canadian Institute for Advanced Research and Royal Society of Canada. Recipient of the Bode Lecture Prize in 2009.	1945	Hendrik W. Bode Lecture Prize (2009)
Edward J. Davison	University of Toronto	Canadian		1928	Giorgio Quazza Medal (1993), Hendrik W. Bode Lecture Prize (1997)
John C. Doyle	California Institute of Technology	American	Co-author of (with Zhou and Glover) Robust and Optimal Control (Prentice Hall, 1996), Essentials of Robust Control (1997), and Feedback Control Theory (Macmillan, 1992).	1954	IEEE Control Systems Award (2004)
Walter R. Evans	General Electric; Rockwell International; Ford Aeronautic Company	American		1920–1999	Rufus Oldenburger Medal (1987), Richard E. Bellman Control Heritage Award (1988)
Bruce Francis	University of Toronto	Canadian		1947–2018	Hendrik W. Bode Lecture Prize (2014), IEEE Control Systems Award (2015)
Gene F. Franklin	Stanford University	American		1927–2012	Hendrik W. Bode Lecture Prize (1994), Richard E. Bellman Control Heritage Award (2005)
Elmer G. Gilbert	University of Michigan	American		1930–2019	IEEE Control Systems Award (1994), Richard E. Bellman Control Heritage Award (1996)
Keith Glover	University of Cambridge	British		1946	IEEE Control Systems Award (2001)
Graham Goodwin	University of Newcastle, Australia	Australian		1945	Hendrik W. Bode Lecture Prize (1999), Giorgio Quazza Medal (2008), IEEE Control Systems Award (2010), Rufus Oldenburger Medal (2013)
J. Karl Hedrick	University of California, Berkeley	American	Total Domination of Etcheverry Hall. Seminal contributions in nonlinear control and estimation.	1944–2017	Rufus Oldenburger Medal (2006)
Yu-Chi "Larry" Ho (何毓琦)	Harvard University	Chinese-American	Co-author of Applied Optimal Control (1969, 1975), the most cited book on the subject. Since 1983 he has been working on discrete event system theory.	1934	IEEE Control Systems Award (1989), Richard E. Bellman Control Heritage Award (1999), Rufus Oldenburger Medal (1999)
Alberto Isidori	Sapienza University of Rome; Washington University in St. Louis	Italian		1942	Giorgio Quazza Medal (1996), Hendrik W. Bode Lecture Prize (2001), IEEE Control Systems Award (2012)
Eliahu I. Jury (إلياهو جوري)	University of California, Berkeley; University of Miami	Iraqi-American		1923	Rufus Oldenburger Medal (1986), Richard E. Bellman Control Heritage Award (1993)
Thomas Kailath	Stanford University	Indian-American	Author of Linear Systems (Prentice Hall, 1980) and co-author of Linear Estimation (Prentice Hall, 2000).	1935	IEEE Medal of Honor (2007), National Medal of Science (2012)
Rudolf E. Kalman (Kálmán Rudolf Emil)	University of Florida; ETH Zurich	Hungarian-American		1930–2016	IEEE Medal of Honor (1974), Rufus Oldenburger Medal (1976), Richard E. Bellman Control Heritage Award (1997), Charles Stark Draper Prize (2008), National Medal of Science (2009)
Hidenori Kimura (木村英紀)	Riken	Japanese		1941	Giorgio Quazza Medal (2011) IEEE Control Systems Award (2021)
Petar V. Kokotovic (Петар В. Кокотовић)	University of California, Santa Barbara	Serbian-American	Works on nonlinear control, both adaptive and robust. He initiated the development of back-stepping (a popular, recursive, design technique). Industry consultant on control of car and jet engines.	1934	Giorgio Quazza Medal (1990), Hendrik W. Bode Lecture Prize (1991), IEEE Control Systems Award (1995), Richard E. Bellman Control Heritage Award (2002)
Arthur J. Krener	Naval Postgraduate School	American		1942	Hendrik W. Bode Lecture Prize (2006), Richard E. Bellman Control Heritage Award (2012), IEEE Control Systems Award (2016)
Miroslav Krstic	University of California, San Diego	Serbian-American	PDE backstepping control, nonlinear delay systems, extremum seeking, adaptive control, stochastic nonlinear stabilization, and their industrial applications	1964	Rufus Oldenburger Medal (2017), W. T. and Idalia Reid Prize (2019), Richard E. Bellman Control Heritage Award (2021), Hendrik W. Bode Lecture Prize (2023) IEEE Roger W. Brockett Control Systems Award (2026)
Harold J. Kushner	Brown University	American		1933	IEEE Control Systems Award (1992), Richard E. Bellman Control Heritage Award (2004)
Ioan Doré Landau	CNRS	French		1938	Rufus Oldenburger Medal (2000)
George Leitmann	University of California, Berkeley	American		1925–2025	Rufus Oldenburger Medal (1995), Richard E. Bellman Control Heritage Award (2009)
Lennart Ljung	Linköping University	Swedish	Author of System identification - Theory for the user (Prentice Hall, 1999) and 12 other books. Fellow IEEE.	1946	Giorgio Quazza Medal (2002), Hendrik W. Bode Lecture Prize (2003), IEEE Control Systems Award (2007)
David Luenberger	Stanford University	American		1937	Hendrik W. Bode Lecture Prize (1990), Rufus Oldenburger Medal (1998)
David Q. Mayne	Imperial College London	British	Works on differential dynamic programming, adaptive control and model predictive control.	1930	IEEE Control Systems Award (2009), Giorgio Quazza Medal (2014)
Sanjoy K. Mitter	Massachusetts Institute of Technology	Indian-American		1933	IEEE Control Systems Award (2000), Richard E. Bellman Control Heritage Award (2007)
Manfred Morari	ETH Zurich; University of Pennsylvania; United Technologies	Austrian-American	Works on model predictive control, optimization for control system, Youla-Parametrization, and internal model control (IMC). Co-author of Predictive Control of Linear and Hybrid Systems and the author of Robust Process Control.	1951	IEEE Control Systems Award (2005), Hendrik W. Bode Lecture Prize (2010), Richard E. Bellman Control Heritage Award (2011), Rufus Oldenburger Medal (2015)
A. Stephen Morse	Yale University	American		1939	IEEE Control Systems Award (1999), Richard E. Bellman Control Heritage Award (2013)
Richard M. Murray	California Institute of Technology	American		1963	Hendrik W. Bode Lecture Prize (2016), IEEE Control Systems Award (2017)
Kumpati S. Narendra	Yale University	Indian-American		1933	Hendrik W. Bode Lecture Prize (1995), Richard E. Bellman Control Heritage Award (2003)
Howard H. Rosenbrock	University of Manchester Institute of Science and Technology	British		1920–2010	IEEE Control Systems Award (1982), Rufus Oldenburger Medal (1994)
Shankar Sastry	University of California, Berkeley	Indian			Rufus Oldenburger Medal (2021)
Eduardo D. Sontag	Northeastern University	Argentine-American		1951	Hendrik W. Bode Lecture Prize (2002), IEEE Control Systems Award (2011)
Masayoshi Tomizuka (富塚诚义)	University of California, Berkeley	Japanese		1946	Rufus Oldenburger Medal (2002), Richard E. Bellman Control Heritage Award (2018)
John G. Truxal	State University of New York at Stony Brook	American		1924–2007	Richard E. Bellman Control Heritage Award (1991), Rufus Oldenburger Medal (1991)
John N. Tsitsiklis (Ιωάννης Νικόλαος Τσιτσικλής)	Massachusetts Institute of Technology	Greek-American		1958	IEEE Control Systems Award (2018), John von Neumann Theory Prize (2018)
Pravin Varaiya	University of California, Berkeley	Indian-American		1940-2022	IEEE Control Systems Award (2002), Hendrik W. Bode Lecture Prize (2005), Richard E. Bellman Control Heritage Award (2008)
Mathukumalli Vidyasagar	University of Texas at Dallas	Indian	Professor of Systems Biology Science at the University of Texas at Dallas. Author of Nonlinear systems analysis (Prentice Hall, 1993 and SIAM, 2002).	1947	IEEE Control Systems Award (2008), Rufus Oldenburger Medal (2012)
Jan C. Willems	University of Groningen	Belgian	Author of The analysis of feedback systems (1971). Worked on LQ control, dissipative systems and linear matrix inequalities. Co-author of Introduction to mathematical system theory – a behavioral approach (Wiley, 1998), where the behavioral approach is a representation free way to discuss system dynamics.	1939–2013	IEEE Control Systems Award (1998)
W. Murray Wonham	University of Toronto	Canadian		1934–2023	IEEE Control Systems Award (1987), Giorgio Quazza Medal (2020)
Dante C. Youla	Polytechnic Institute of New York University	American		1925	IEEE Control Systems Award (1988)
Lotfi A. Zadeh (Persian: لطفی علی‌عسگرزاده; Azerbaijani: Lütfi Rəhim oğlu Ələsgərzadə)	University of California, Berkeley	Iranian-Azerbaijani-American		1921–2017	Eringen Medal (1976), Rufus Oldenburger Medal (1993), IEEE Medal of Honor (1995), Richard E. Bellman Control Heritage Award (1998), Golden Goose Award (2017)
Moshe Zakai (משה זכאי)	Technion	Israeli		1926–2015	IEEE Control Systems Award (1993)
George D. Zames	McGill University	Polish-Canadian		1934–1997	IEEE Control Systems Award (1985), Rufus Oldenburger Medal (1996)

== Eminent researchers of USSR (including Russian SFSR, Ukrainian SSR, Byelorussian SSR, etc. from 1922 to 1991) ==
Name	Institution	Place of birth	Contributions	Age	Awards
Nikolay Bogolyubov (Никола́й Никола́евич Боголю́бов)	National Academy of Sciences of Ukraine	Nizhny Novgorod	Together with Nikolay Krylov developed the describing function method as an approximate procedure for analyzing nonlinear control problems.	1909–1992	Stalin Prize (1947, 1953), Lenin Prize (1958), USSR State Prize (1984), Lomonosov Gold Medal (1985)
Yakov Z. Tsypkin (Яков За́лманович Цы́пкин)	Moscow Institute of Physics and Technology; Moscow Power Engineering Institute	Dnipropetrovsk		1919–1997	Lenin Prize (1960), Giorgio Quazza Medal (1984), Rufus Oldenburger Medal (1989)
N. N. Krasovski (Никола́й Никола́евич Красо́вский)	Ural State University	Yekaterinburg		1923	Lenin Prize (1976), USSR State Prize (1984), IEEE Control Systems Award (2003)
Vladimir Yakubovich (Влади́мир Андре́евич Якубо́вич)	Saint Petersburg State University	Novosibirsk	Pioneered the usage of linear matrix inequalities in control theory. Considered as the father of the field.	1926–2012	IEEE Control Systems Award (1996)
Faina Mihajlovna Kirillova (Фаина Михайловна Кириллова)	National Academy of Sciences of Belarus	Zuyevka	Developed a constructive theory of extremal problems, proved the quasi-maximum principle for discrete systems, and developed algorithms for adaptive optimization.	1931	USSR Council of Ministers Prize (1986)
Vadim Utkin (Вадим Иванович Уткин)	Ohio State University	Moscow		1937	Lenin Prize (1972), Rufus Oldenburger Medal (2003)

== Other active researchers ==
Name	Institution	Nationality	Contributions	Field	Awards
Damiano Brigo	Imperial College		Works on nonlinear filtering (jointly introduced with Bernard Hanzon and François Le Gland the projection filters).		
William L. Brogan	University of Nevada, Las Vegas		Author of book Modern Control Theory. ISBN 0-13-589763-7		
Munther A. Dahleh	Massachusetts Institute of Technology		Co-author of Control of Uncertain Systems: A Linear Programing Approach (Prentice Hall, 1995).		
Moonyong Lee	Yeungnam University		Adviser of Process Systems Design and Control Laboratory. Working on IMC based Optimal Design of Industrial Three Term Controllers, Robust Analytical Design of Multi-loop PID Controllers, Optimization Based Controller Design for Constrained Optimal Control, Advanced Control for Thermally Coupled Distillation Process, Real-time Monitoring and Control Software Package, Optimal Design of Thermally Coupled Distillation Process Including Divided Wall Column.		
Karl Henrik Johansson	KTH Royal Institute of Technology	Sweden	Works in many areas, including application of hybrid systems and networked control system, security of cyber-physical systems, and model reduction.		IEEE Fellow 2013, Fellow of Royal Swedish Academy of Engineering Science 2017
Mehran Mesbahi	University of Washington		Works on networks, distributed robotics, aerospace GN&C, and optimization. Co-author of the book "Graph Theoretic Methods in Multiagent Networks" (Princeton, 2010).		
Jan H. van Schuppen	Free University of Amsterdam and CWI		is author of more than one hundred publications in control theory, system identification, realization theory and filtering.		
Arjan van der Schaft	University of Groningen		He is notable for his contributions to network modeling and control of complex systems as Port-Hamiltonian systems, Passivity-based Control, Nonlinear H_infty control and Hybrid systems. He is a Fellow of the (IEEE).		
S. S. Sritharan	Naval Postgraduate School		(Developed Deterministic and Stochastic Control Theory and nonlinear filtering for Fluid Dynamics and MHD using Navier–Stokes equations and magnetohydrodynamic equations as state space models).		
Peter Stoica	Uppsala University		Works on System Identification and Modeling.		
Jakob Stoustrup	Aalborg University		Works on loop-transfer recovery, gain scheduled control, fault tolerant control and several other areas.		
Roberto Tempo	CNR-IEIIT, Politecnico di Torino		Author of the book titled Randomized Algorithms for Analysis and Control of Uncertain Systems, with Applications (Springer-Verlag, 2013).		
Kevin Warwick	University of Reading		Developed the first state-space based self-tuning controller, now involved more in application studies of feedback control, particularly where a human is part of the system.		
Stephen Yurkovich	University of Texas at Dallas		Fellow of the IEEE, and holds the Louis Beecherl, Jr. Distinguished Chair in Engineering at the University of Texas at Dallas, where he is also Program Head of Systems Engineering.		
Yutaka Yamamoto	Kyoto University	Japan	Author of the book Repetitive Control (in Japanese) and a large number of research, survey and tutorial articles. Fellow of the IEEE. Former Chair of the IEEE Control System (CSS) Society.		
Masayuki Fujita	Tokyo Institute of Technology	Japan	works on passivity-based control in robotics, multi-agent robotics, and robust control. co-author of Passivity-Based Control and Estimation in Networked Robotics.		IEEE Fellow 2016

== Historical figures in systems and control ==
These people have made outstanding historical contributions to systems and control.

Given Names	Last Name	Institution	Year	Contributions
George Biddell	Airy		1840	Early investigations into the instability phenomenon in Watt governors.
William Ross	Ashby	University of Illinois at Urbana–Champaign		Made many early contributions to cybernetics and complex systems, such as the concept of variety (cybernetics).
Robert H.	Park		1929	Published last century's 2nd-ranked power engineering paper for developing Park Transform of AC machines with time-invariant-coefficient LDEs, widely used for vector control in AC drive & other power electronics applications.
Richard	Bellman		1953	Developed dynamic programming
Harold Stephen	Black	Worcester Polytechnic Institute	1927	Invented the negative-feedback amplifier
Hendrik	Bode		1945	Published Network Analysis and Feedback Amplifier Design (Van Nostrand), invented the Bode plot and introduced the Bode integral formula.
Nikolay	Bogolyubov			Together with Nikolay Krylov developed the describing function method as an approximate procedure for analyzing nonlinear control problems.
Leonhard	Euler			Developed the Laplace transform, the main tool for analyzing LTI systems. His Euler–Lagrange equation is the basis for model predictive control.
Rudolf	Kalman		1960	Pioneered the state-space approach to systems and control. Introduced the notions of controllability and observability. Developed the Kalman filter for linear estimation.
Walter R.	Evans			Developed the root locus method for feedback design.
Gene F.	Franklin			His 1958 text "Sampled-Data Control Systems" introduced digital control to a discipline which had previously operated almost exclusively in the analog domain.
Joseph	Fourier			Introduced the Fourier series, allowing analysis in the frequency domain.
Ernst A.	Guillemin			Developed techniques for analysis and synthesis of networks of RLC components.
Harold	Hazen		1934	Author of Theory of Servomechanisms.
Faina	Kirillova	National Academy of Sciences of Belarus		Developed a constructive theory of extremal problems, proved the quasi-maximum principle for discrete systems, and developed algorithms for adaptive optimization.
Andrey	Kolmogorov			Co-developer of the Wiener–Kolmogorov filter. Formulated the Kolmogorov forward and backward equations in the theory of stochastic processes.
Nikolay	Krylov			together with Nikolay Bogolyubov developed the describing function method as an approximate procedure for analyzing nonlinear control problems.
Irmgard	Flügge-Lotz	Stanford University		Developed discontinuous automatic control, which laid the foundation for automatic on-off aircraft control in jets.
Alexander	Lyapunov		1892	His paper Sur le problème général de la stabilité du mouvement (in French) marks the beginning of stability theory.
James Clerk	Maxwell		1868	Paper "On governors" investigated the stability of governors in a systematic way and discovered the necessary conditions for stability.
Nicolas	Minorsky		1922	Ship designer, was the first to provide an analysis of the three term (or PID) controller and to suggest its use for ship steering.
Nathaniel B.	Nichols		1947	Developed the Nichols plot. Published Theory of Servomechanisms with H. M. James and R. S. Phillips.
Harry	Nyquist		1927	Developed the Nyquist stability criterion for feedback systems (1932) and co-developed Nyquist–Shannon sampling theorem.
Lev	Pontryagin			Main author of Pontryagin's minimum principle for optimal control problems.
Vasile	Popov			Developed the Kalman–Yakubovich–Popov lemma and the Popov criterion for stability.
John R.	Ragazzini		1954	His book Sampled-data control systems introduced digital control and the z-transform.
Edward John	Routh			Early theorist, developed Routh–Hurwitz theorem and Routh–Hurwitz stability criterion.
Claude E.	Shannon			Developed information theory and pioneered switching theory.
John	Tukey			Developed the Fast Fourier transform algorithm, which made frequency analysis easy to implement.
Norbert	Wiener			Co-developer of the Wiener-Kolmogorov filter. Coined the term Cybernetics. Studied the stochastic process known as the Wiener process.
W. Murray	Wonham		1974	Linear Multivariable Control. Supervisory control theory. Internal Model Principle. Pole Assignment Theorem.
Vladimir Andreevich	Yakubovich	Saint Petersburg State University	1996	Pioneered the usage of linear matrix inequalities in control theory.
George	Zames	McGill University		Developed robust control theory, including the small-gain theorem and H-infinity control.

== See also ==
- List of engineers
- List of systems engineers
- List of systems scientists
