= Hendrik W. Bode Lecture Prize =

The Hendrik W. Bode Lecture Prize is an award given by the IEEE Control Systems Society (CSS) to recognize distinguished contributions to control systems science or engineering. It was established in 1989, named after Hendrik W. Bode (1905–1982), a pioneer of modern control theory and system engineering, who revolutionized both the content and methodology of his chosen fields of research during his long career at Bell Labs and Harvard University.

The recipient of the award gives a plenary lecture at the annual IEEE Conference on Decision and Control (CDC). The inaugural Bode Prize Lecture was delivered by Gunter Stein at the 28th IEEE CDC in Tampa, Florida, on December 15, 1989.

== Recipients ==
- 1989: Gunter Stein
- 1990: David Luenberger
- 1991: Petar V. Kokotovic
- 1992: Brian D.O. Anderson
- 1993: Michael Athans
- 1994: Gene F. Franklin
- 1995: Kumpati S. Narendra
- 1996: Jurgen Ackermann
- 1997: Edward J. Davison
- 1998: J. Boyd Pearson
- 1999: Graham C. Goodwin
- 2000: Mathukumalli Vidyasagar
- 2001: Alberto Isidori
- 2002: Eduardo D. Sontag
- 2003: Lennart Ljung
- 2004: Tamer Başar
- 2005: Pravin Varaiya
- 2006: Arthur J. Krener
- 2007: P. S. Krishnaprasad
- 2008: Christopher I. Byrnes
- 2009: Peter E. Caines
- 2010: Manfred Morari
- 2011: John Baillieul
- 2012: Jessy W. Grizzle
- 2013: B. Ross Barmish
- 2014: Bruce Francis
- 2015: Hassan Khalil
- 2016: Richard M. Murray
- 2017: Naomi Ehrich Leonard
- 2018: Mark W. Spong
- 2019: Lei Guo
- 2020: Kristin Y. Pettersen
- 2021: Pramod Khargonekar
- 2022: David J. Hill
- 2023: Miroslav Krstić
- 2024: Karl Henrik Johansson
- 2025: Jacquelien Scherpen

== See also ==
- List of people in systems and control
- List of engineering awards
- IEEE Control Systems Award
- Giorgio Quazza Medal
- Richard E. Bellman Control Heritage Award
- Rufus Oldenburger Medal
