= Giorgio Quazza Medal =

The Giorgio Quazza Medal is an award given by the International Federation of Automatic Control (IFAC) to a distinguished control engineer, presented at each IFAC Triennial International World Congress. It was established in 1979, as a memorial to the late Giorgio Quazza, a leading Italian electrical and control engineer who served IFAC in many capacities in a most distinguished manner. The award is given for "outstanding lifetime contributions of a researcher and/or engineer to conceptual foundations in the field of systems and control."

== Recipients ==
- 1981: John F. Coales
- 1984: Yakov Z. Tsypkin
- 1987: Karl J. Åström
- 1990: Petar V. Kokotovic
- 1993: Edward J. Davison
- 1996: Alberto Isidori
- 1999: Brian D. O. Anderson
- 2002: Lennart Ljung
- 2005: Tamer Basar
- 2008: Graham Goodwin
- 2011: Hidenori Kimura
- 2014: David Mayne
- 2017: Roger Brockett
- 2020: W. Murray Wonham
- 2023: A. Stephen Morse

== See also ==
- List of people in systems and control
- List of engineering awards
- IEEE Control Systems Award
- Hendrik W. Bode Lecture Prize
- Richard E. Bellman Control Heritage Award
- Rufus Oldenburger Medal
