= Jan Camiel Willems =

- Born: 18 September 1939; Bruges, Belgium
- Died: 31 August 2013 (aged 73)
- Education: Massachusetts Institute of Technology; University of Rhode Island; Ghent University
- Awards: IEEE Control Systems Award; Honorary doctorate, University of Liège
- Scientific career
- Fields: Mathematical Systems Theory; Electrical Engineering
- Workplaces: University of Groningen; Massachusetts Institute of Technology
- Doctoral advisor: Roger W. Brockett
- Notable students: Keith Glover; Arjan van der Schaft; Henk Nijmeijer; Harry Trentelman

Jan Camiel Willems (18 September 1939 – 31 August 2013) was a Belgian mathematical system theorist who has done most of his scientific work while residing in the Netherlands and the United States. He is most noted for the introduction of the notion of a dissipative system and for the development of the behavioral approach to systems theory.

== Biography ==
Jan Willems was born in Bruges in 1939. He studied engineering at the University of Ghent, obtained the M.Sc. degree from the University of Rhode Island, and the Ph.D. degree from the Massachusetts Institute of Technology in electrical engineering in 1968. He was an assistant professor in the department of electrical engineering at MIT from 1968 to 1973. On 1 February 1973 he was appointed professor of systems and control in the mathematics department of the University of Groningen. In 2003 he became emeritus professor. Afterwards, he became guest professor at the KU Leuven. He served terms as chairperson of the European Union Control Association and of the Dutch Mathematical Society (Wiskundig Genootschap). He was managing editor of the SIAM Journal of Control and Optimization and as founding and managing editor of Systems & Control Letters.

== Research contributions ==
In his Ph.D. dissertation, Willems worked on input/output stability. In an often-cited 1972 paper (Note: J. C. Willems. Dissipative dynamical systems – Part I: General theory, Part II: Part II: Linear systems with quadratic supply rates , Volume 45, pages 321–351 and 352–393, 1972. Available online http://homes.esat.kuleuven.be/~jwillems/Articles/JournalArticles/1972.1.pdf.) he introduced the notion of a dissipative system. This notion is a generalization of Lyapunov function to input/state/output systems. The construction of the storage function, as the analogue of a Lyapunov function is called, led to the study of the linear matrix inequality (LMI) in control theory. Applied to linear-quadratic-Gaussian control, the construction of the storage function leads to the Kalman–Yakubovich–Popov lemma. In the 1980s Willems worked on the geometric theory of linear systems, where he introduced the notion of almost invariant subspace. Since the 1990s, he has devoted his interest to the development of the behavioral approach to systems theory and control. (Note: J. Polderman and J. C. Willems. Introduction to Mathematical Systems Theory. Springer-Verlag, New York, 1998. Available online http://wwwhome.math.utwente.nl/~poldermanjw/onderwijs/DISC/mathmod/book.pdf.) (Note: J. C. Willems. The behavioral approach to open and interconnected systems: Modeling by tearing, zooming, and linking. Control Systems Magazine, 27:46–99, 2007. Available online http://homes.esat.kuleuven.be/~jwillems/Articles/JournalArticles/2007.1.pdf.) In the behavioral approach a dynamical system is simply viewed as a family of trajectories. This approach avoids having to separate the system variables into inputs and outputs.

== Awards and honors ==
Willems was a fellow of the IEEE, the Society for Industrial and Applied Mathematics, the American Mathematical Society and International Federation of Automatic Control. In 1998 he was an Invited Speaker of the International Congress of Mathematicians in Berlin. In 1998, he received the IEEE Control Systems Award "for seminal contributions to control theory and leadership in systems research". In 2010, he became doctor honoris causa of the University of Liège.
