= W. M. Wonham =

Canadian physicist (1934–2023)

W. Murray Wonham FRSC
- Wonham in 2015
- Born: Walter Murray Wonham; 1934; Montreal, Quebec, Canada
- Died: May 14, 2023 (aged 88); Toronto, Ontario, Canada
- Education: McGill University (BEng); University of Cambridge (PhD)
- Known for: Linear Multivariable Control, Supervisory control theory, Internal Model Principle, Pole Assignment Theorem
- Awards: IEEE Control Systems Award (1987); Brouwer Medal (1990); Giorgio Quazza Medal (2020)
- Scientific career
- Fields: Control theory
- Workplaces: University of Toronto
- Doctoral advisor: John Coales
- Website: https://www.control.utoronto.ca/~wonham/

Walter Murray Wonham FRSC (1934 – May 14, 2023) was a Canadian control theorist and professor at the University of Toronto. He focused on multi-variable geometric control theory, stochastic control and stochastic filters, and the control of discrete event systems from the standpoint of mathematical logic and formal languages.

== Education ==
Wonham attended a boys' school and preferred individual to team sports, taking up sailing and tennis. He obtained his bachelor's degree in engineering physics from McGill University in 1956 and a doctorate in stochastic control from the University of Cambridge in 1961.

== Career ==
In the 1960s, he worked at Purdue University's Control and Information Systems Laboratory, Martin Marietta's Research Institute for Advanced Studies (RIAS) in Baltimore, Brown University's Department of Applied Mathematics, and in the Office for Control Theory and Applications of NASA's Electronics for Research Center, where he developed a geometric theory of multivariable control with A. Stephen Morse. In 1968, Wonham proved a separation theorem for controls in a more general cost functional class with many technical assumptions and restrictions.

Wonham returned to Canada in 1970, after fifteen years away, and joined the University of Toronto as an associate professor in the Faculty of Electrical Engineering. Being with the university's Control Theory Group as a full professor since 1972, he served as Dean of Engineering and Applied Sciences at the University of Toronto between 1992 and 1996. He was made university professor in 1996 and appointed University Professor Emeritus upon his retirement in 2000.

Wonham and his student Bruce Francis first articulated the internal model principle in 1976, which is a good regulator restricted to the ordinary differential equations subset of control theory. As an explicit formulation of the Conant and Ashby good regulator theorem, it stands in contrast to classical control where the classical feedback loop fails to explicitly model the controlled system (although the classical controller may contain an implicit model). In 1987, Wonham and Peter Ramadge introduced supervisory control theory as a method for automatically synthesizing supervisors that restrict the behavior of a plant such that as much as possible of the given specifications are fulfilled.

Wonham authored and co-authored about seventy-five research papers, as well as the book Linear Multivariable Control: A Geometric Approach. He was a Fellow of the Royal Society of Canada and the Institute of Electrical and Electronics Engineers (IEEE). He was an Honorary Professor of the Beijing University of Aeronautics and Astronautics and a Foreign Member of the (U.S.) National Academy of Engineering.

== Death ==
Wonham died on May 14, 2023, at the age of 88.

== Selected works ==
- Linear multivariable control: a geometric approach. Springer 1979
- Supervisor Localization: A Top-Down Approach to Distributed Control of Discrete-Event Systems. Springer 2016
- Supervisory Control of Discrete-Event Systems. Springer 2019
