= Tamer Başar =

Turkish electrical engineer (born 1946)

- Born: January 19, 1946 (age 80); Istanbul, Turkey
- Citizenship: Turkish American
- Education: Boğaziçi University, Istanbul(1969) B.S.; Yale University, New Haven (1972) Ph.D.
- Known for: The development of dynamic game theory and its applications to robust control of systems with uncertainty, Decentralized systems, distributed detection and estimation; Mobile and distributed computing; Applications of control and game theory in economics
- Scientific career
- Fields: Mathematical optimization, Dynamic game theory and Robust control
- Workplaces: University of Illinois at Urbana; Boğaziçi University, Istanbul
- Thesis: On a Class of Minimax State Estimators for Linear Systems with Unknown Forcing Functions
- Doctoral advisor: Max Luria Mintz
- Other academic advisors: Kumpati S. Narendra; A. Stephen Morse

Mustafa Tamer Başar (born January 19, 1946) is a control and game theorist who is the Swanlund Endowed Chair and Center for Advanced Study Professor of Electrical and Computer Engineering at the University of Illinois at Urbana-Champaign, USA. He is also the Director of the Center for Advanced Study (since 2014).

== Education ==
Tamer Başar received a B.S. in Electrical Engineering from Boğaziçi University (formerly known as Robert College) at Bebek, in Istanbul, Turkey, in 1969, and M.S., M.Phil., and Ph.D. in engineering and applied science from Yale University, in 1970, 1971 and 1972, respectively.

== Academic life ==
He joined the University of Illinois at Urbana–Champaign - Electrical and Computer Engineering Department in 1981. He was the founding president of the International Society of Dynamic Games during 1990–1994, the president of the IEEE Control Systems Society in 2000, and the president of the American Automatic Control Council during 2010–2011. He received the Medal of Science of Turkey in 1993, H.W. Bode Lecture Prize of the IEEE Control Systems Society in 2004, Georgia Quazza Medal of the International Federation of Automatic Control in 2005, the Richard E. Bellman Control Heritage Award in 2006, Isaacs Award of the International Society of Dynamic Games in 2010, and IEEE Control Systems Award in 2014. He was elected as a member of National Academy of Engineering in 2000 in Electronics, Communication & Information Systems Engineering and Industrial, Manufacturing & Operational Systems Engineering for the development of dynamic game theory and application to robust control of systems with uncertainty. He is a Fellow of IEEE, IFAC, and SIAM.

== Honorary degrees and chairs ==
He has been awarded Honorary Doctor of Science degrees and Honorary Professorships from:

- Honorary Professorship, Shandong University, Jinan, China, 2019
- Honorary Chair Professorship from Tsinghua University, Beijing, China in 2014
- Honorary Doctorate (Doctor Honoris Causa) from Boğaziçi University, Istanbul, Turkey in 2012
- Honorary Doctorate from the National Academy of Sciences of Azerbaijan in 2011
- Honorary Professorship from Northeastern University, Shenyang, China in 2008
- Honorary Doctorate (Doctor Honoris Causa) from Doğuş University, Istanbul, Turkey in 2007
- Swanlund Endowed Chair Professorship at UIUC in 2007

== Research areas ==
His research interests include optimal, robust, and nonlinear control; large-scale systems; dynamic games; stochastic control; estimation theory; stochastic processes; and mathematical economics.

== Awards ==
- American Academy of Arts and Sciences Member (2023)
- IEEE Control Systems Award (2014)
- Honorary Chair Professorship from Tsinghua University, Beijing, China (2014)
- Honorary Doctorate (Doctor Honoris Causa) from Boğaziçi University, Istanbul (2012)
- SIAM Fellow (2012)
- Honorary Doctorate from the National Academy of Sciences of Azerbaijan (2011)
- Isaacs Award of ISDG (2010, 2014)
- Honorary Professorship from Northeastern University, Shenyang, China (2008)
- Swanlund Endowed Chair at UIUC (2007)
- Honorary Doctorate (Doctor Honoris Causa) from Doğuş University, Istanbul (2007)
- Richard E. Bellman Control Heritage Award (2006)
- Giorgio Quazza Medal of IFAC (2005)
- Outstanding Service Award of IFAC (2005)
- IFAC Fellow (2005)
- Center for Advanced Study Professorship at UIUC (2005)
- Hendrik Wade Bode Lecture Prize of the IEEE Control Systems Society (2004)
- Tau Beta Pi Daniel C. Drucker Eminent Faculty Award of the College of Engineering of UIUC (2004)
- Elected to the National Academy of Engineering (of the USA) (2000)
- IEEE Millennium Medal (2000)
- Fredric G. and Elizabeth H. Nearing Distinguished Professorship at UIUC (1998)
- Axelby Outstanding Paper Award (1995)
- Distinguished Member Award of the IEEE Control Systems Society (1993)
- Medal of Science of Turkey (1993)
- IEEE Fellow (1983)

== See also ==
- List of game theorists
- List of members of the National Academy of Engineering (Electronics)

Awards and achievements
Preceded by Stephen P. Boyd	IEEE Control Systems Award; 2014	Succeeded by Bruce Francis
Preceded by Gene F. Franklin	Richard E. Bellman Control Heritage Award; 2006	Succeeded by Sanjoy K. Mitter
