= Lennart Ljung =

Lennart Ljung may refer to:

- Lennart Ljung (engineer) (born 1946), Swedish engineer and professor
- Lennart Ljung (general) (1921–1990), Swedish Army general
