= Roberto Tempo =

Italian scientist

- Born: Roberto Tempo; April 10, 1956; Cuorgnè, Italy
- Died: January 14, 2017 (aged 60); Rifugio Jervis, Ceresole Reale, Italy
- Education: Politecnico di Torino
- Awards: IEEE CSM Outstanding Paper Corresponding member of Bologna Academy of Sciences; IFAC Fellow; IEEE CSS Distinguished Member; IEEE Fellow IFAC Outstanding Paper Prize
- Scientific career
- Fields: Electrical Engineering; Mathematics; Applied Engineering Systems Theory
- Workplaces: Institute of Electronics, Computer and Telecommunication Engineering (IEIIT) CNR

Roberto Tempo (April 10, 1956 – January 14, 2017) was an Italian scientist, known for his studies on complex networked systems in information technology.

== Life and career ==
He graduated in Electrical Engineering in 1980 at Politecnico di Torino, joined the National Research Council of Italy (CNR) at the research institute IEIIT, Torino, serving as a Director of Research of Systems and Computer Engineering since 1991. He also served in visiting and research positions at Tsinghua University and Chinese Academy of Sciences in Beijing, Kyoto University, The University of Tokyo, University of Illinois at Urbana-Champaign, German Aerospace Research Organization in Oberpfaffenhofen and Columbia University in New York City.

== Research ==
The success of the distributed randomized methods proposed by Roberto Tempo is witnessed by the monograph “Randomized Algorithms for Analysis and Control of Uncertain Systems”, that was published by Springer-Verlag, laying the foundations of probabilistic methods in the analysis and design of systems affected by deterministic and stochastic uncertainty, and also encompassing statistical learning theory and sequential methods for control.

One of his last research activity was dedicated to opinion dynamics and led to the Science paper “Network Science on Belief System Dynamics Under Logic Constraints”, written in collaboration with Noah E. Friedkin, A. V. Proskurnikov, and S. E. Parsegov. This seminal paper proposes a mathematical model that describes the relationship and time-varying behavior of belief systems and interpersonal influence.

In continuation of his research in opinion dynamics and distributed randomized techniques, his last submission was “Resilient Randomized Quantized Consensus”, where it introduces randomized updates to tighten the topological condition required for consensus among integer-valued agents.

== Professional Services ==
He served the IEEE Control System Society (CSS) in various forms: he was vice-president for Conference Activities (2002–2003), President-Elect (2009) and President (2010). He was also Program Chair of the first joint IEEE Conference on Decision and Control (CDC) and European Control Conference (Seville, Spain, 2005) and General Co-chair for IEEE CDC (Firenze, Italy, 2013). He also was an officer of the International Federation of Automatic Control (IFAC) as Chair of the Italian National Member Organization, and Editor in Chief of the IFAC flagship journal Automatica (since 2015). He also served as member of the IFAC Fellow Selection Committee, 2011-2014 and 2015–2017.

== Life ==
Roberto Tempo was a skier, hiker, and climber. He was a national instructor of ski mountaineering for the Italian Alpine Club and climbed at 7a difficulty. He was involved with the mountains within the control community; his final President's Message for the IEEE Control Systems Society was titled "Mountains and Control."

== Awards ==
- 2018: Best Paper Award of the University Stuttgart for the paper "Constraint-tightening and stability in stochastic model predictive control" by M. Lorenzen, F. Dabbene, R. Tempo and F. Allgöwer which appeared in IEEE Transactions on Automatic Control, Vol. 62, n. 7, pp 3165–3177, July 2017.
- 2014: IEEE Control Systems Magazine Outstanding Paper Award for the paper titled “The PageRank Problem, Multi-Agent Consensus and Web Aggregation: A Systems and Control Viewpoint,” by H. Ishii and R. Tempo which appeared in IEEE Control Systems Magazine, Vol. 34, pp. 34–53, 2014
- 2011: Corresponding member of the Academy of Sciences of the Institute of Bologna
- 2007: IFAC Fellow of the International Federation of Automatic Control "for his contributions to the analysis and control of uncertain systems, and for pioneering the probabilistic approach to robustness"
- 2005: Distinguished Member Award of the IEEE Control Systems Society for "significant technical contributions and outstanding long-term service"
- 2000: IEEE Fellow of the Institute of Electrical and Electronics Engineers (IEEE), for "contributions to robust identification and control of uncertain systems"
- 1990: IFAC Outstanding Paper Prize Award for the three-year period 1990-1992 for the paper titled “The Robust Root Locus,” by B. R. Barmish and R. Tempo which appeared in Automatica, Vol. 26, pp. 283–292, 1990

== Roberto Tempo Best CDC Paper Award ==
In 2018 the IEEE instituted the Roberto Tempo Best CDC Paper Award, "to recognize outstanding papers presented at the IEEE Conference on Decision and Control". The prize consists in a cash award of $1,000, and a Galvanic (photo engraved) plaque for each author of the winning paper. The award is funded by an endowment jointly provided by the Control System Society and Roberto Tempo's family and managed by the IEEE Foundation. Basis for judging are: Originality, potential impact on any aspect of control theory, technology, or implementation.

== Roberto Tempo Colloquia ==
The Systems Modeling and Control group of the Institute of Electronics and Information and Telecommunications Engineering of the National Research Council (IEIIT-CNR) of Italy has organized a series of Colloquia to honor Roberto's memory. The Roberto Tempo Colloquia in Automatica are general seminars held by renowned scientists. They range over all aspects of systems and control, and on interdisciplinary subjects where control plays a fundamental role. The first colloquium was held by Bob Barmish on Friday 8 June 2018.

== PReGio Roberto Tempo Award ==
In 2017 the Institute of Electronics and Information and Telecommunications Engineering of the National Research Council (IEIIT-CNR) of Italy instituted 'PReGio Roberto Tempo'. PReGio Roberto Tempo is aimed at IEIIT-CNR young researchers with a temporary position and consists of a grant of €3,500.00 to be awarded to the best research published in the last two years in an international peer-reviewed scientific journal.

== Book in honor of Roberto Tempo: Uncertainty in Complex Networked Systems ==
In 2018 the book "Uncertainty in Complex Networked Systems. In Honor of Roberto Tempo" has been published by the Springer International Publishing. The chapters in this volume celebrate the life and research of Roberto Tempo on complex networked systems, focusing on the analysis and control under uncertainty, and robust designs and presenting applications such as PageRank in Google and opinion dynamics in social networks.
