= Jakob Stoustrup =

Danish engineer

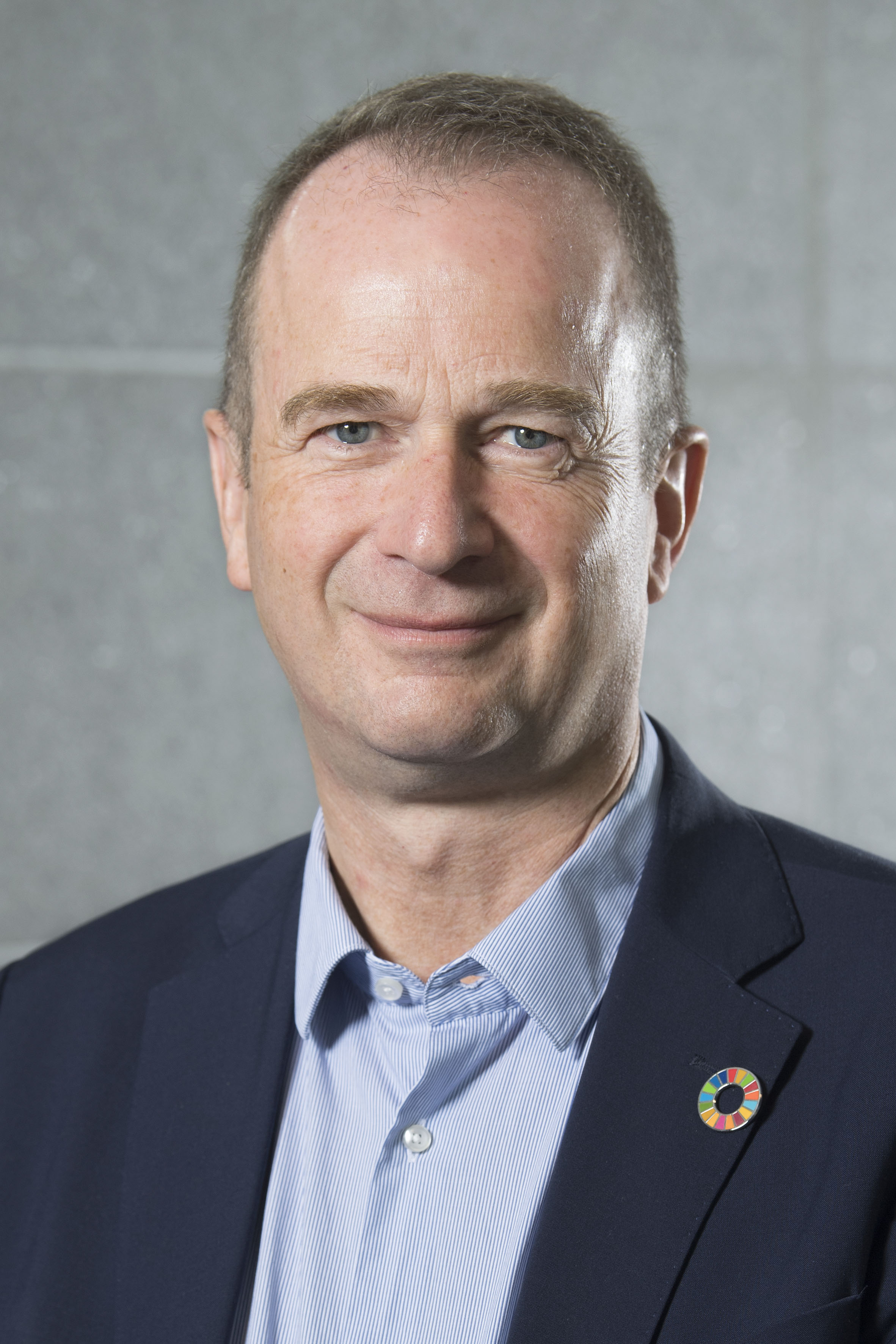
- Born: January 16, 1963 (age 63); Aalborg, Denmark
- Education: Technical University of Denmark
- Known for: Robust control Fault-tolerant control Plug-and-play control
- Awards: The Statoil Prize; The Dannin Award for Scientific Research
- Scientific career
- Fields: Control Theory
- Workplaces: Aalborg University; Technical University of Denmark
- Doctoral advisor: Martin Philip Bendsøe

Jakob Stoustrup is a Danish researcher employed at Aalborg University, where he serves as professor of control theory at the Department of Electronic Systems.

== Education ==
Jakob Stoustrup received the M.Sc. degree in Electrical Engineering in 1987, and the Ph.D. degree in Applied Mathematics in 1991, both from the Technical University of Denmark.

== Background, career, and scientific contributions ==
After a first position as teaching assistant at the Technical University of Denmark, and visiting researcher at Eindhoven University of Technology, The Netherlands, 1988, he became Senior Researcher sponsored by Danish Technical Research Council, 1991. Assistant Professor 1991–1995, and Associate Professor 1995–1996, both at the Department of Mathematics, Technical University of Denmark. He was visiting professor at the University of Strathclyde, Glasgow, U.K., in 1996, and later visiting professor at the Mittag-Leffler Institute, Stockholm, Sweden, 2003. From 1997–2013 and since 2016 (full) Professor at Automation & Control, Aalborg University, and from 2006–2013, he acted as Head of Research for the Department of Electronic Systems. From 2014 to 2016 he acted as Chief Scientist with the Pacific Northwest National Laboratory, where he led the Control of Complex Systems Initiative. In 2017, Jakob Stoustrup was appointed as pro-dean for the TECH Faculty at Aalborg University.

Stoustrup has been a Member of the Swedish Research Council (Signals and Systems), of the Norwegian Research Council, of the European Research Council and of The Danish Research Council for Technology and Production Sciences. He has acted as associate editor, guest editor, and editorial board member of international journals. At several occasions, Jakob Stoustrup has acted as plenary speaker at international conferences, and he has also acted as a General Chair for such events. Jakob Stoustrup has been appointed by the Institute of Electrical and Electronics Engineers, as Chairman of a Control Systems Society/Robotics & Automation Society Joint Chapter. In 2008, Jakob Stoustrup was elected as Chairman for a Technical Committee of the International Federation of Automatic Control, TC6.4. In 2011, he was appointed as a member of the Technical Board of the International Federation of Automatic Control. Jakob Stoustrup has extensive industrial cooperation, and has been CEO for two technological start-up companies. He has led numerous major research projects based on a high number of research grants and contracts.

The main contributions of Jakob Stoustrup have been to robust control theory and to the theory of fault tolerant control systems. In these two areas he has published approximately 300 peer-reviewed scientific papers. In 2009, Jakob Stoustrup proposed a novel research direction in the area of control theory, called plug-and-play control. As an unusual accomplishment, his work spans the whole range from the development of new theoretical methods to practical industrial applications.

In the area of robust control theory, Jakob Stoustrup has in particular contributed to the development of loop transfer recovery methods for the design of H_{∞} controllers and to the development of robust design methods for systems having parametric uncertainty descriptions. Loop transfer recovery methods have been among the most popular model based design methods used in industry for decades, due to their intuitive relationships between full state feedback designs and observer based designs. Loop transfer recovery methods were originally designed as an extension to the LQG design methodology, but Jakob Stoustrup and his co-workers advanced the recovery methods to the area of H_{∞} control, thereby admitting robustness aspects to be included directly in the design paradigm.

Jakob Stoustrup's contributions to the design of robust controllers for systems with parametric uncertainty descriptions have mainly been focusing on establishing methods based on convex optimization. Whereas parametric uncertainty descriptions are often natural candidates for systems with first principle models, because they reflect the variation of physical parameters, the underlying optimization problems often turns out to be non-convex, meaning that they do not readily admit efficient on-line solutions with guaranteed performance. However, in the work of Stoustrup and co-workers, it was described how a class of such problems could be turned into convex optimization problems, and explicit algorithms for efficient solutions were suggested. One theoretical result from Stoustrup in the area of robust control states that for a fairly general class of systems, the order of a decentralized H_{∞} controller tends to infinity as the performance approaches its optimal value, and in fact that not even an infinite-dimensional (causal) controller exists in that case.

In the area of fault tolerant control systems, the main contribution of Jakob Stoustrup has been to introduce a number of optimization based methods in order to solve fault diagnosis and fault tolerant control problems. The results include explicit methods for time-varying, non-linear, and uncertain systems for the design of fault diagnosis and fault tolerant control systems. Inspired by his previous work in the area of robust control theory, Jakob Stoustrup and his co-workers has proposed a general architecture for the modeling and design of fault diagnosis and fault tolerant control systems, handling the above-mentioned challenges.

One theoretical result by Jakob Stoustrup in the area of fault tolerant control systems provides a positive answer to a previously open problem. By a constructive proof it is established that under mild conditions, a feedback controller for a system with two or more sensors always exists such that the system remains stable if the signal from any one of the sensors disappear. It is also shown, however, that the smallest order of such a controller can be unboundedly large.

Besides from the theoretical achievements mentioned above, Jakob Stoustrup has accomplished to bring a significant number among the theoretical results to actual industrial practice. Jakob Stoustrup and his group have worked with a significant number of industries in a wide range of industrial sectors. Examples of industrial applications from his group include:

- Control of smart power grids
- Automatic door opening systems
- Control of arc welding processes
- Control of biomass based power plants
- Control of compact disk players
- Control of fuel cells
- Control of heating systems
- Control of heating, ventilation, and air-conditioning systems
- Control of indoor climate in stables
- Control of marine boilers
- Control of refrigeration systems
- Design of 3D sensor systems
- Fault diagnosis in power plants
- Fault diagnosis of automobile suspension systems
- Fault estimation for a spacecraft re-entry mission
- Integrated supervisory control for production plants
- Modeling of bond option pricing
- Non-Hermitian transitions in quantum dynamics
- Object recognition systems
- Robust control of wind turbines
- Tension and thickness control in hot strip mills
- Biped walking robots

These industrial applications have been carried out by Jakob Stoustrup in cooperation with more than 50 industrial companies in several countries.

== Notable honors and awards ==
- The Statoil Prize (1997)
- Member of The Danish Academy of Technical Sciences (2005)
- The Dannin Award for Scientific Research (2006)
- Knight of the Order of the Dannebrog (2015)

== See also ==
- Control theory
- Robust control
- Model predictive control
- Fault detection and isolation
- Fault-tolerant system
- Electrical engineering
