= Karl Henrik Johansson =

Swedish researcher

Karl H. Johansson
- Born: 1967 (age 58–59); Växjö, Sweden
- Citizenship: Swedish
- Education: Lund University
- Awards: IEEE Control Systems Society Hendrik W. Bode Lecture Prize; IFAC Outstanding Service Award; Swedish Research Council Distinguished Professor; Fellow of the Royal Swedish Academy of Engineering Sciences; IEEE Control Systems Society Distinguished Lecturer; Knut and Alice Wallenberg Foundation Wallenberg Scholar; Fellow of the IEEE; Swedish Foundation for Strategic Research Future Research Leader; IFAC Young Author Prize
- Scientific career
- Fields: Control theory; Cyber-physical systems; Networked control systems; Hybrid systems
- Workplaces: KTH Royal Institute of Technology
- Doctoral advisor: Karl Johan Åström; Anders Rantzer
- Website: https://people.kth.se/~kallej

Karl Henrik Johansson (born 1967 in Växjö, Sweden) is a Swedish researcher and best known for his pioneering contributions to networked control systems, cyber-physical systems, and hybrid systems. His research has had particular application impact in transportation, automation, and energy networks. He holds a Chaired Professorship in Networked Control at the KTH Royal Institute of Technology in Stockholm, Sweden. He is Director of KTH Digital Futures.

== Career ==
Karl H. Johansson graduated from Lund University in Sweden with an MSc in 1992 and a PhD in 1997. He did a postdoc at UC Berkeley 1998-2000 and has since then held the positions of Assistant, Associate, and Full Professor at the Department of Automatic Control at KTH Royal Institute of Technology. He has directed the ACCESS Linnaeus Centre 2009-2016 and the Strategic Research Area ICT TNG 2013-2020, two of the largest research environments in electrical engineering and computer science in Sweden. He has held visiting positions at UC Berkeley, California Institute of Technology, Nanyang Technological University, Hong Kong University of Science and Technology Institute of Advanced Studies, Norwegian University of Science and Technology, and Zhejiang University.

He is the IEEE Control Systems Society Vice President of Diversity, Outreach & Development, an IFAC Council Member, and a past president of the European Control Association. He has served on the Swedish Research Council's Scientific Council for Natural Sciences and Engineering Sciences, IEEE Control Systems Society Board of Governors, IFAC Executive Board. He is past Chair of the IFAC Technical Committee on Networked Systems.

He has been on the Editorial Boards of Automatica, IEEE Transactions on Automatic Control, IEEE Transactions on Control of Network Systems, IET Control Theory and Applications, Annual Review of Control, Robotics, and Autonomous Systems, European Journal of Control, and ACM Transactions on Internet of Things, and currently serves on the Editorial Board of ACM Transactions on Cyber-Physical Systems. He was the General Chair of the ACM/IEEE Cyber-Physical Systems Week 2010 and IPC Chair of many conferences.

His research focuses on networked control systems, cyber-physical systems, and applications in transportation, energy, and automation networks; areas in which he has co-authored more than 900 journal and conference papers. He has advised more than 60 postdocs and 34 PhD students.

== Honours ==
Karl H. Johansson has received several best paper awards and other distinctions from IEEE, IFAC, and ACM. He is the recipient of the 2024 IEEE Control Systems Society Hendrik W. Bode Lecture Prize. He received the IFAC Outstanding Service Award 2023. In 2017 he was awarded Distinguished Professor of the Swedish Research Council and in 2009 he was awarded Wallenberg Scholar, as one of the first ten scholars from all sciences, by the Knut and Alice Wallenberg Foundation. He was awarded Future Research Leader from the Swedish Foundation for Strategic Research in 2005. He received the triennial Young Author Prize from IFAC in 1996 and the Peccei Award from IIASA, Austria, in 1993. He was granted Young Researcher Awards from Scania AB in 1996 and from Ericsson in 1998 and 1999. He is Fellow of the IEEE and the Royal Swedish Academy of Engineering Sciences, and he is Distinguished Lecturer with the IEEE Control Systems Society.

== Works ==
- D. V. Dimarogonas, E. Frazzoli, K. H. Johansson, "Distributed event-triggered control for multi-agent systems," IEEE Transactions on Automatic Control, vol. 57, no. 5, pp. 1291-1297, May 2012. doi: 10.1109/TAC.2011.2174666
- K. H. Johansson, "The quadruple-tank process: a multivariable laboratory process with an adjustable zero," in IEEE Transactions on Control Systems Technology, vol. 8, no. 3, pp. 456-465, May 2000. doi: 10.1109/87.845876
- J. Lygeros, K. H. Johansson, S. N. Simic, J. Zhang, S. S. Sastry, "Dynamical properties of hybrid automata," in IEEE Transactions on Automatic Control, vol. 48, no. 1, pp. 2-17, Jan. 2003. doi: 10.1109/TAC.2002.806650
- A. Teixeira, I. Shames, H. Sandberg, K. H. Johansson, "A secure control framework for resource-limited adversaries," Automatica, Volume 51, 2015, Pages 135-148, ISSN 0005-1098, doi.org/10.1016/j.automatica.2014.10.067
- B. Besselink, V. Turri, S. H. van de Hoef, K.-Y. Liang, A. Alam, J. Mårtensson, K. H. Johansson, "Cyber–physical control of road freight transport," in Proceedings of the IEEE, vol. 104, no. 5, pp. 1128-1141, May 2016. doi: 10.1109/JPROC.2015.2511446
- A. Keimer, N. Laurent-Brouty, F. Farokhi, H. Signargout, V. Cvetkovic, A. M. Bayen, K. H. Johansson, "Information patterns in the modeling and design of mobility management services," in Proceedings of the IEEE, vol. 106, no. 4, pp. 554-576, April 2018. doi: 10.1109/JPROC.2018.2800001
