= IEEE Roger W. Brockett Control Systems Award =

- Awarded for: outstanding contributions to control systems engineering, science or technology
- Sponsored by: IEEE Control Systems Society
- Location: Awards ceremony of the IEEE Control Systems Society
- Presented by: Institute of Electrical and Electronics Engineers
- First award: 1982
- Website: https://corporate-awards.ieee.org/corporate-awards/#field-awards

The IEEE Roger W. Brockett Control Systems Award is a technical field award given to an individual by the Institute of Electrical and Electronics Engineers (IEEE) "for outstanding contributions to control systems engineering, science or technology". It is an IEEE-level award, created in 1980 by the board of directors of the IEEE, but sponsored by the IEEE Control Systems Society.

Originally the name was IEEE Control Systems Science and Engineering Award, but after 1991 the IEEE changed it to IEEE Control Systems Award, and in 2025 to IEEE Roger W. Brockett Control Systems Award.

Recipients of this award receive a bronze medal, a certificate, and an honorarium.

== Recipients ==
The following people received the IEEE Control Systems Science and Engineering Award:

- 1982: Howard H. Rosenbrock
- 1983: No award
- 1984: Arthur E. Bryson, Jr.
- 1985: George Zames
- 1986: Charles A. Desoer
- 1987: Walter Murray Wonham
- 1988: Dante C. Youla
- 1989: Yu-Chi Ho
- 1990: Karl Johan Åström
- 1991: Roger W. Brockett

The following people received the IEEE Control Systems Award:

- 1992: Harold J. Kushner
- 1993: Moshe M. Zakai
- 1994: Elmer G. Gilbert
- 1995: Petar V. Kokotovic
- 1996: Vladimir A. Yakubovich
- 1997: Brian D. O. Anderson
- 1998: Jan C. Willems
- 1999: A. Stephen Morse
- 2000: Sanjoy K. Mitter
- 2001: Keith Glover
- 2002: Pravin Varaiya
- 2003: N. N. Krasovski
- 2004: John C. Doyle
- 2005: Manfred Morari
- 2006: P. R. Kumar
- 2007: Lennart Ljung
- 2008: Mathukumalli Vidyasagar
- 2009: David Q. Mayne
- 2010: Graham Clifford Goodwin
- 2011: Eduardo D. Sontag
- 2012: Alberto Isidori
- 2013: Stephen P. Boyd
- 2014: Tamer Başar
- 2015: Bruce Francis
- 2016: Arthur J. Krener
- 2017: Richard M. Murray
- 2018: John N. Tsitsiklis
- 2019: Pramod Khargonekar
- 2020: Anders Lindquist
- 2021: Hidenori Kimura
- 2022: Dimitri Bertsekas
- 2023: Naomi Leonard
- 2024: Alain Bensoussan
- 2025: Malcolm C. Smith

The following people received the IEEE Roger W. Brockett Control Systems Award:

- 2026: Miroslav Krstić
- 2027: Arjan van der Schaft

== See also ==
- List of people in systems and control
- List of engineering awards
- Giorgio Quazza Medal
- Hendrik W. Bode Lecture Prize
- Richard E. Bellman Control Heritage Award
- Rufus Oldenburger Medal
