= Arthur J. Krener =

American mathematician (born 1942)

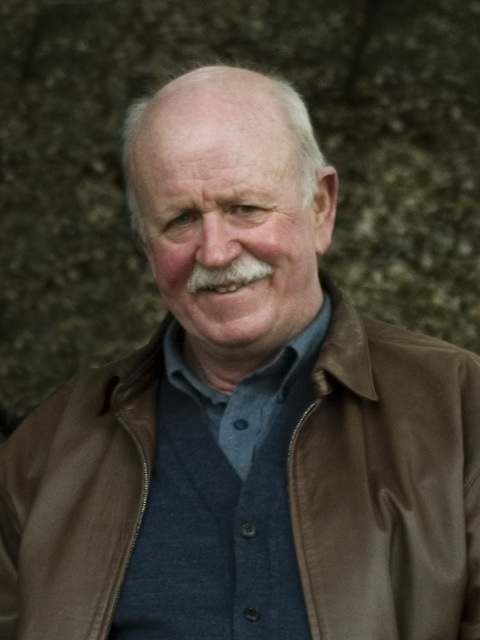
- Born: October 8, 1942 (age 83); Brooklyn, New York, U.S.
- Education: College of the Holy Cross (BS); University of California, Berkeley (MA, PhD)
- Known for: Krener's theorem
- Awards: Richard E. Bellman Control Heritage Award (2012); IEEE Control Systems Award (2016)
- Scientific career
- Fields: Applied mathematics
- Workplaces: University of California, Davis; Naval Postgraduate School
- Thesis: A Generalization of the Pontryagin Maximal Principle and the Bang-Bang Principle (1971)
- Doctoral advisor: Stephen Diliberto

Arthur James Krener (born October 8, 1942) is an American mathematician. He is a distinguished visiting professor in the department of applied mathematics at the Naval Postgraduate School. He has made contributions in the areas of control theory, nonlinear control, and stochastic processes.

== Biography ==
=== Early life and education ===
Krener was born in Brooklyn, New York, on October 8, 1942. He received a Bachelor of Science (B.S.) in mathematics from the College of the Holy Cross in 1964 then pursued graduate studies in mathematics at the University of California, Berkeley, where he earned a Master of Arts (M.A.) in 1967 and a Ph.D. in 1971. In his dissertation, Krener showed that the Lie bracket played a role in nonlinear controllability by proving a version of Chow's theorem.

=== Career ===
After receiving his doctorate, Krener became a professor of mathematics at the University of California, Davis, where he remained for 35 years. He was an assistant professor of mathematics from 1971–1976, then an associate professor from 1976 until 1980, when he received a full-time appointment. From 1987 to 1992, Krener was the chair of the university's mathematics department.

Krener retired from Davis as a distinguished professor in 2006 and joined the department of applied mathematics at the Naval Postgraduate School in Monterey, California. His research interests are in developing methods for the control and estimation of nonlinear dynamical systems and stochastic processes.

Krener has been a visiting professor at Harvard University, Imperial College London, the NASA Ames Research Center, the University of Paris, the University of Maryland, the University of Padua, and North Carolina State University.

In 1988 he founded the SIAM Activity Group on Control and Systems Theory and was its first chair. He was again chair of the SIAG CST in 2005–07.

In 2012, he received the Richard E. Bellman Control Heritage Award from the AACC. The citation reads "For contributions to the control and estimation of nonlinear systems."

In 2016, he received the IEEE Control Systems Award for "contributions to the analysis, control, and estimation of nonlinear control systems."

== Work ==
Several years later with Hermann, he gave the definitive treatment of controllability and observability for nonlinear systems. This work was later cited by the IEEE Control Systems Society as one of Twenty Five Seminal Papers in Control, published in the twentieth century, which have made a major impact on the field of control.

With Isidori, Gori-Giorgi and Monaco, he gave conditions for the existence and construction of decoupling and noninteracting control laws for nonlinear systems. This paper won the George S. Axelby Outstanding Paper Award from IEEE Transactions on Automatic Control and Krener received the Medal of the University of Rome for his contributions. It also led to the concept of the zero of a nonlinear system, which was subsequently developed by Byrnes and Isidori and extended to the backstepping technique of control by Kokotovic, Krstic and many others.

== Awards ==
- IEEE Control Systems Award, IEEE, 2016.
- Richard E. Bellman Control Heritage Award, AACC, 2012.
- IFAC Certificate of Excellent Achievement, 2010.
- IEEE Hendrik W. Bode Lecture Prize, 2006
- W.T. and Idalia Reid Prize in Mathematics, SIAM, 2004.
- Guggenheim Fellowship 2001
- Fellow of the AMS, 2014
- Fellow of SIAM, inaugural class of 2009
- Fellow of IFAC
- Life Fellow of the IEEE, 1990

== See also ==
- Krener's theorem
- Backstepping
