= Brian Anderson (electrical engineer) =

Australian engineer

Brian D. O. Anderson AC FRS
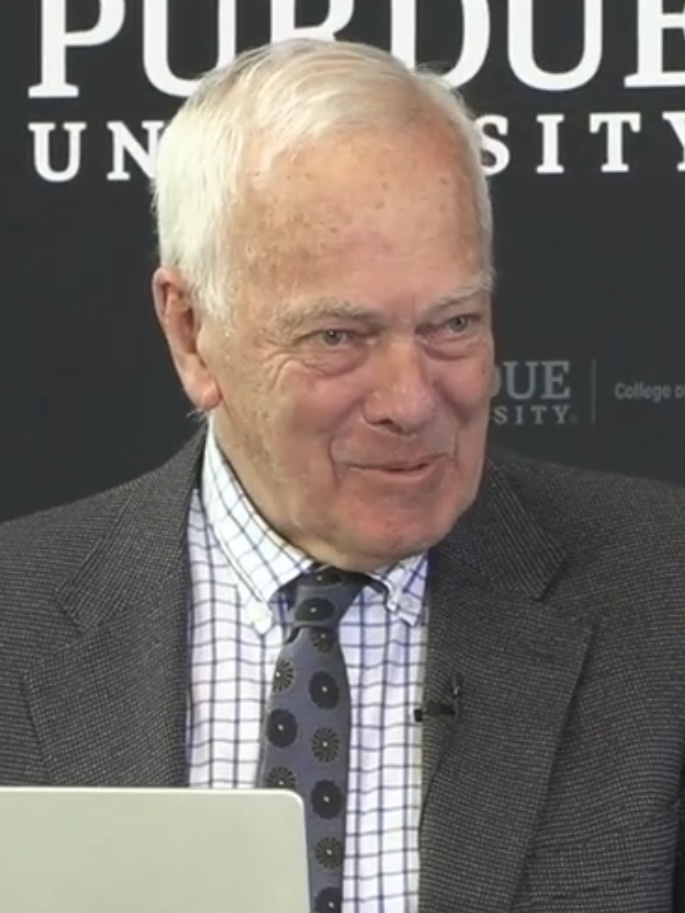
- Brian Anderson in 2024
- Born: 15 January 1941 (age 85)
- Education: Stanford University
- Awards: M. A. Sargent Medal
- Scientific career
- Institutions: Australian National University

Brian David Outram Anderson AC FRS (born 15 January 1941) is Professor in the Research School of Information Sciences and Engineering at the Australian National University. His research interests include circuits, signal processing and control, and his current work focuses on distributed control of multi-agent systems, sensor network localization, adaptive and non-linear control. Professor Anderson served as President of the Australian Academy of Science from 1998 to 2002.

Anderson was elected as a member into the National Academy of Engineering in 2002 for his contributions to system and control theory, and for international leadership in promoting engineering science and technology.

Dianne Anderson is Brian's wife. They both live in Canberra.

== Education ==
Anderson received a BS (1962) in mathematics and BE (1964) in electrical engineering from the University of Sydney and a PhD (1966) in electrical engineering from Stanford, under Robert W. Newcomb.

== Awards and honours ==
- 1992 – Matthew Flinders Medal and Lecture
- 1992 – Hendrik W. Bode Lecture Prize
- 1993 – Officer of the Order of Australia
- 1997 – IEEE Control Systems Award
- 1999 – Giorgio Quazza Medal
- 2001 – IEEE James H. Mulligan, Jr. Education Medal
- 2001 – Centenary Medal (Australia)
- 2002 – M A Sargent Medal
- 2007 – Order of the Rising Sun, Gold Rays with Neck Ribbon (Japan)
- 2016 – Companion of the Order of Australia
- 2016 – John R. Ragazzini Award

== Membership of learned societies ==
- 1974 – Australian Academy of Science, Fellow.
- 1975 – Institute of Electrical and Electronics Engineers, Fellow.
- 1980 – Australian Academy of Technological Sciences and Engineering, Fellow.
- 1985 – Institution of Engineers Australia, Honorary Fellow.
- 1989 – Royal Society, London, Fellow.
- 2002 – National Academy of Engineering, USA, Foreign Associate.
- 2005 – International Federation of Automatic Control, Fellow.
