= Ali Jadbabaie =

- Education: California Institute of Technology; University of New Mexico; Sharif University of Technology
- Scientific career
- Fields: Control theory, Network Science, Robotics,
- Workplaces: Massachusetts Institute of Technology
- Academic advisors: John Doyle and Richard M. Murray

Ali Jadbabaie is an Iranian-American systems scientist and decision theorist and the JR East Professor of Engineering at Massachusetts Institute of Technology. Prior to joining MIT, he was the Alfred Fitler Moore Professor of Network Science in the Department of Electrical and Systems Engineering at the University of Pennsylvania and a postdoc at the department of Electrical and Computer Engineering at Yale University under A. Stephen Morse (2001–2002). Jadbabaie is an internationally renowned expert in the control and coordination of multi-robot formations, distributed optimization, network economics, and network science. He is currently the head of the Civil and Environmental Engineering Department at MIT. Previously he served as the Associate director of the Institute for Data, Systems and Society (IDSS) at MIT and was the program Head for the Social and Engineering Systems PhD program. He was a cofounder and director of the Singh Program in Networked & Social Systems Engineering (NETS) at the University of Pennsylvania's School of Engineering and Applied Sciences.

== Education ==
- Ph.D. Control and Dynamical Systems, October 2000, California Institute of Technology, Pasadena, CA, USA
- M.S. Electrical Engineering, December 1997, University of New Mexico, Albuquerque, NM, USA
- B.S. Electrical Engineering, February 1995, Sharif University of Technology, Tehran, Iran
