= Robert W. Newcomb =

Professor of electrical engineering

Robert W. Newcomb is a professor of electrical engineering at the University of Maryland, College Park. He obtained a BSEE degree from Purdue University in 1955, an MS from Stanford University in 1957, and his Ph.D. in Electrical Engineering from the University of California at Berkeley in 1960. He was a professor in the electrical engineering department at Stanford University through 1968, and from 1969 onward has been a professor in the electrical engineering department at the University of Maryland at College Park. He has graduated over 70 Ph.D. students from both Stanford and the University of Maryland, including Brian D. O. Anderson.

He currently directs the Microsystems Laboratory at the University of Maryland.

His work during his career has spanned a variety of subdisciplines in electrical engineering, and has produced the following:

- The design and fabrication of the first MEMS micromotor in the 1960s
- Several books on VLSI, control, and circuit theory
- The extension of Maxwell's equations into n-dimensions
- Conceptualization of the Soliton, the P-Adic, and the Fibonacci computers
- n-port synthesis techniques for analog and DSP systems
- VLSI implementation of biologically realistic neural components
- Theory of curve tracing and knot tying robots

He is both a Life Fellow of IEEE and a Fellow of AIMBE. His recognition being the recipient of the IEEE CAS Society Golden Jubilee Medal award and the first recipient of the IEEE CAS Society Education award.
