= Krener's theorem =

In mathematics, Krener's theorem is a result attributed to Arthur J. Krener in geometric control theory about the topological properties of attainable sets of finite-dimensional control systems. It states that any attainable set of a bracket-generating system has nonempty interior or, equivalently, that any attainable set has nonempty interior in the topology of the corresponding orbit. Heuristically, Krener's theorem prohibits attainable sets from being hairy.

== Theorem ==
Let ${\ }\dot q=f(q,u)$ be a smooth control system, where ${\ q}$ belongs to a finite-dimensional manifold $\ M$ and $\ u$ belongs to a control set $\ U$. Consider the family of vector fields ${\mathcal F}=\{f(\cdot,u)\mid u\in U\}$.

Let $\ \mathrm{Lie}\,\mathcal{F}$ be the Lie algebra generated by ${\mathcal F}$ with respect to the Lie bracket of vector fields. Given $\ q\in M$, if the vector space $\ \mathrm{Lie}_q\,\mathcal{F}=\{g(q)\mid g\in \mathrm{Lie}\,\mathcal{F}\}$ is equal to $\ T_q M$, then $\ q$ belongs to the closure of the interior of the attainable set from $\ q$.

== Remarks and consequences ==
Even if $\mathrm{Lie}_q\,\mathcal{F}$ is different from $\ T_q M$, the attainable set from $\ q$ has nonempty interior in the orbit topology, as it follows from Krener's theorem applied to the control system restricted to the orbit through $\ q$.

When all the vector fields in $\ \mathcal{F}$ are analytic, $\ \mathrm{Lie}_q\,\mathcal{F}=T_q M$ if and only if $\ q$ belongs to the closure of the interior of the attainable set from $\ q$. This is a consequence of Krener's theorem and of the orbit theorem.

As a corollary of Krener's theorem one can prove that if the system is bracket-generating and if the attainable set from $\ q\in M$ is dense in $\ M$, then the attainable set from $\ q$ is actually equal to $\ M$.
