= Harry Trentelman =

Harry Trentelman is a full professor in Systems and Control at the Johann Bernoulli Institute for Mathematics and Computer Science of the University of Groningen. From 1985 to 1991 he served as an assistant professor and as an associate professor at the Mathematics Department of the Eindhoven University of Technology, the Netherlands. He obtained his PhD degree in Mathematics from the University of Groningen in 1985. His Ph.D. thesis was titled "Almost Invariant Subspaces and High Gain Feedback Mathematics Subject Classification: 93—Systems theory; control" which he defended following studying for it under mentorship from Jan Camiel Willems.

Trentelman serves as a senior editor of the IEEE Transactions on Automatic Control and as an associate editor of Automatica. He is past associate editor of the SIAM Journal on Control and Optimization and Systems and Control Letters. Trentelman was named Fellow of the Institute of Electrical and Electronics Engineers (IEEE) in 2015 for "contributions to geometric theory of linear systems and behavioral models".
