= Keith Glover =

British electrical engineer

Keith Glover FRS FREng
- Education: MIT; Imperial College London
- Known for: contributions to robust controller design and model order reduction
- Awards: IEEE Control Systems Award
- Scientific career
- Fields: control engineering
- Workplaces: University of Cambridge; University of Southern California
- Thesis: Structural Aspects of System identification (1973)
- Doctoral advisor: Jan C. Willems
- Website: eng.cam.ac.uk/profiles/kg103

Keith Glover is a British electrical engineer. He is an emeritus professor of control engineering at the University of Cambridge. He is notable for his contributions to robust controller design and model order reduction.

== Education ==
Glover studied at Imperial College London (BSc, 1967) and MIT (PhD, 1973).

== Career and research ==
From 1973 to 1976, he worked as an assistant professor at the University of Southern California. In 1976, he moved to the University of Cambridge, where he became professor of control engineering and a fellow of Sidney Sussex College.

Glover's research has dealt with both theoretical contributions to control and practical applications in the automotive and aerospace domains. A notable contribution was the development (with Duncan McFarlane) of the 'H_{∞} loop-shaping' technique for robust control design. When awarding him the IEEE Control Systems Award, the IEEE cited Glover's 'pioneering and fundamental contributions to robust controller design and model order reduction'.

Glover remained in post at Cambridge until his retirement. During his career there, he served a term (2002–2009) as the Department of Engineering's head. His sixtieth birthday and his retirement were both celebrated with 'GloverFest' workshops in his honour. He retired from his professorship in 2013, becoming an emeritus professor.

== Awards and honours ==
Glover was a visiting fellow at the Australian National University (1983–1984) and a Japan Society for the Promotion of Science fellow (1991). Glover has received the following awards:

- Elected a Fellow of the Royal Society (FRS) in 1993.
- A Fellowship of the Royal Academy of Engineering, awarded in 2001.
- A Fellowship of the IEEE, awarded in 1993.
- The IEEE Control Systems Award, in 2001.
