= Karl Johan Åström =

Swedish control theorist (1934–2026)

- Born: 5 August 1934
- Died: 12 November 2026 (aged 92); Lund, Sweden
- Education: Royal Institute of Technology
- Awards: Rufus Oldenburger Medal (1985); IEEE Medal of Honor (1993)
- Scientific career
- Fields: Electrical engineering
- Doctoral students: Lennart Ljung; Karl Henrik Johansson

Karl Johan Åström (5 August 1934 – 12 November 2026) was a Swedish control theorist, who made contributions to the fields of control theory and control engineering, computer control and adaptive control. In 1965, he described a general framework of Markov decision processes with incomplete information, that ultimately led to the notion of a Partially observable Markov decision process.

In 1995, Åström was elected as a member into the National Academy of Engineering for contributions to identification, stochastic, and adaptive control and their incorporation in control engineering practice.

== Life and career ==
Åström was born in Östersund, Sweden, and received his M.Sc. in Engineering Physics (1957) and PhD in Automatic Control and Mathematics (1960) from the Royal Institute of Technology (KTH) in Stockholm, where he also taught from 1955 to 1960 while working on inertial guidance for the Swedish National Defence Research Institute.

In 1961 Åström joined the IBM Nordic Laboratory to work on computerized process control, with tours at IBM Research in Yorktown Heights, New York (1962) and San Jose, California (1963). After his return he led efforts in the computer control of paper manufacturing machinery. In 1965, Åström was named chair of the newly founded Department of Automatic Control at Lund University, Sweden.

From 1965 to 1999 he was chair of the Department of Automatic Control at Lund University, where he was professor emeritus. Since 2002 he has been distinguished visiting professor at the University of California, Santa Barbara.

He was a Fellow of the IEEE, member of the Royal Swedish Academy of Sciences, vice president of the Royal Swedish Academy of Engineering Sciences (IVA), and a foreign associate of the US National Academy of Engineering. He was awarded the ASME Rufus Oldenburger medal (1985) and the International Federation of Automatic Control Quazza Medal (1987). In 1987 he was also awarded the degree Docteur Honoris Causa from l'Institut National Polytechnique de Grenoble. He received in 1989 the IEEE Donald G. Fink Prize Paper Award, in 1990 the IEEE Control Systems Science and Engineering Award, and in 1993 the IEEE Medal of Honor for his "fundamental contributions to theory and applications of adaptive control technology".

Åström died on 12 November 2026, at the age of 92.

== Publications ==
Books

- 1970. Introduction to Stochastic Control. Academic Press, 1970; Dover, 2006.
- 1989. Adaptive Control. With B Wittenmark. Addison-Wesley, 1989.
- 1996. Computer-controlled Systems, Theory and Design. With B Wittenmark. Prentice Hall, 1996; Dover, 2011. (IFAC Textbook award for first edition, 1993)
- 2005. Advanced PID Control. With T Hägglund. ISA, 2005.
- 2008. Feedback Systems: An Introduction for Scientists and Engineers. With R. Murray. Princeton University Press, 2008. (IFAC Textbook award, 2011)

Papers

- KJ Åström, B Wittenmark. "On self-tuning regulators," Automatica, vol. 9, pp. 185–199, 1973.

== See also ==
- Partially observable Markov decision process
