= Vladimir Yakubovich =

Russian mathematician (1926–2012)

Vladimir Andreevich Yakubovich (October 21, 1926 in Novosibirsk – August 17, 2012 in the Gdov region) was a notable Russian control theorist and head of the Department of Theoretical Cybernetics at Saint Petersburg State University (formerly Leningrad University).

In 1996 he received the IEEE Control Systems Award for his contributions to control theory, including the Kalman–Yakubovich–Popov lemma.
