= William L. Brogan =

American control theorist, professor

- Scientific career
- Fields: Control theory
- Institutions: University of Nevada, Las Vegas

William L. Brogan is an American control theorist and a Professor of Electrical Engineering at the University of Nevada, Las Vegas. He is well known as the author of the book Modern Control Theory, one of the highly cited references in the field. He was made a Fellow of the IEEE in 1989 for "contributions to filtering and control theory, its implementation in practical applications, and for related educational programs". He received his B.S.M.E degree from the State University of Iowa in 1958. He earned an M.S. and Ph.D. in engineering from UCLA in 1961 and 1965, respectively.
