= John Baillieul =

American mechanical engineer

John Baillieul (born May 13, 1945) is an American control theorist and distinguished professor in the Department of Mechanical Engineering at Boston University.

Baillieul is a fellow of the International Federation of Automatic Control, the Institute of Electrical and Electronics Engineers, and the Society for Industrial and Applied Mathematics. He served as president of the IEEE Control Systems Society in 2006, and was editor-in-chief of the IEEE Transactions on Automatic Control from 1992 to 1998 and editor-in-chief of the SIAM Journal on Control and Optimization from 2006 to 2011.

He graduated from Harvard University with a PhD in 1975.
