= Elmer G. Gilbert =

American aerospace engineer (1930–2019)

- Born: March 29, 1930
- Died: June 16, 2019 (aged 89)
- Citizenship: American
- Education: University of Michigan
- Awards: Richard E. Bellman Control Heritage Award (1996); IEEE Fellow
- Scientific career
- Fields: Control theory

Elmer Grant Gilbert (March 29, 1930 – June 16, 2019) was an American aerospace engineer and a Professor Emeritus of Aerospace Engineering at the University of Michigan. He received his Ph.D. in Instrumentation Engineering from Michigan in 1957.

Gilbert was a member of the National Academy of Engineering and a recipient of the 1994 IEEE Control Systems Award (the citation reads: "for pioneering and innovative contributions to linear state space theory and its applications, especially realization and decoupling, as well as to control algorithms") and the 1996 Richard E. Bellman Control Heritage Award from the American Automatic Control Council.

Gilbert died on June 16, 2019, at the age of 89.
