= Miroslav Krstić =

American control theorist

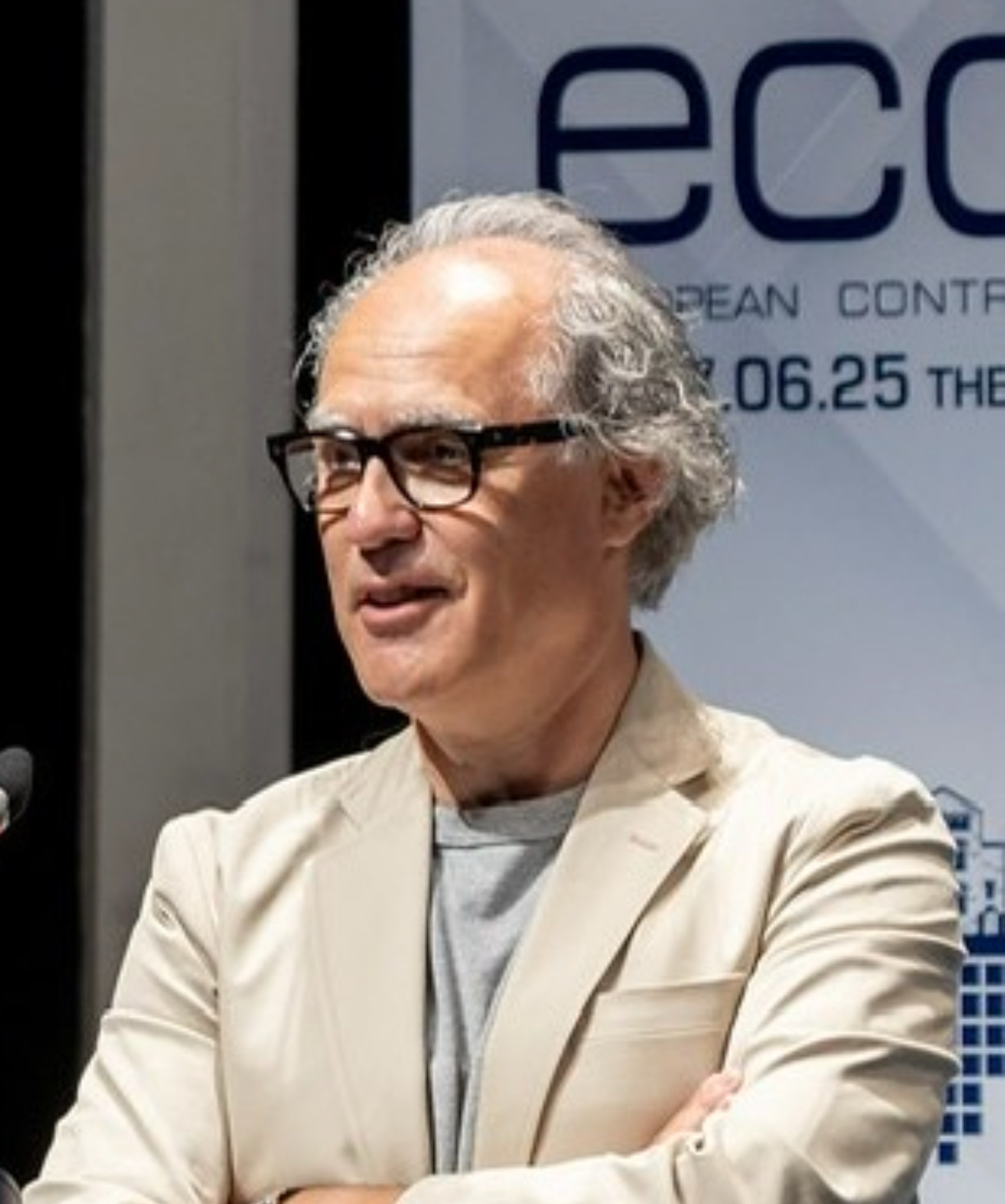
- Krstić in 2025
- Born: 14 September 1964 (age 62); Pirot, Serbia, Yugoslavia
- Citizenship: United States
- Education: University of Belgrade BSc (1989); University of California, Santa Barbara PhD (1994)
- Known for: PDE backstepping, extremum seeking
- Awards: IEEE Roger W. Brockett Control Systems Award AACC Richard E. Bellman Control Heritage Award; IEEE Hendrik W. Bode Lecture Prize; SIAM W. T. and Idalia Reid Prize ASME Rufus Oldenburger Medal
- Scientific career
- Fields: Control theory
- Workplaces: University of California, San Diego
- Doctoral advisor: Petar V. Kokotovic

Miroslav Krstić (Serbian Cyrillic: Мирослав Крстић) is an American control theorist, Distinguished Professor and Senior Associate Vice Chancellor for Research at University of California, San Diego (UCSD).

As of November 2026, ScholarGPS ranks him as the world's second-most highly cited author in the field of control theory.

== Education ==
After obtaining his undergraduate degree from University of Belgrade's School of Electrical Engineering in 1989 and two years of teaching control courses at University of Belgrade, Krstić enrolled at University of California, Santa Barbara, California in Fall 1991 for PhD study with Petar Kokotovic. His first journal paper, "Adaptive control without overparametrization", submitted on October 24, 1991, became influential in adaptive control, reaching nearly a thousand citations in Google Scholar as of November 2026. Krstić's 1994 PhD dissertation earned the campuswide Lancaster Best Dissertation Award, was published by Wiley in 1995, and is one of the classics of control theory. For single-authored papers from his PhD, Krstić earned the 1996 O. Hugo Schuck and 1998 George S. Axelby outstanding paper awards. He also received the best student paper awards of the 1993 IEEE Conference on Decision and Control and 1995 American Control Conference.

== Faculty career ==
After two years as assistant professor at University of Maryland, Krstić became an associate professor at the University of California, San Diego (UCSD) in 1997. In 2000, after receiving the NSF CAREER Award and the Presidential Early Career Award for Scientists and Engineers and receiving funding from the Office of Naval Research Young Investigator Program, he was promoted to full professor, and in 2015 to Distinguished Professor. Krstić received the UC San Diego Chancellor's Award for Research in 2005. In 2008 he founded the UCSD Center for Control Systems and Dynamics, which was originally called the Cymer Center for Control Systems and Dynamics. Since 2012 he has served as Senior Associate Vice-Chancellor for Research.

== Research in control theory ==
Krstić is a co-author of 19 books, about 530 journal papers, and is the highest-published author as of November 2026 in both of the flagship control systems journals, Automatica and IEEE Transactions on Automatic Control (according to Scopus), with more than 120 papers in each of the two journals.

His research publications have included the subject areas of nonlinear and adaptive control, extremum seeking, partial differential equation (PDE) backstepping, predictors for nonlinear systems with delays, non-overshooting and "safe" nonlinear control, and machine learning for PDE-based control systems. Those publications have introduced tuning-function and modular adaptive designs, nonlinear swapping, passivity-based identifiers, and adaptive control Lyapunov functions (CLFs) and input-to-state-stability (ISS) CLFs; stochastic backstepping, noise-to-state stability, and inverse optimal differential games with respect to noise covariance; stability analysis of extremum seeking for general nonlinear dynamical systems, source seeking, Nash equilibrium seeking, Newton-based extremum seeking, model-free stabilization by extremum seeking, extremum seeking for maps with large delays and PDEs, and stochastic extremum seeking; PDE backstepping transformations and kernel PDEs, backstepping for PDE-ODE and PDE-PDE cascades, adaptive PDE backstepping, traffic flow stabilization, and additive manufacturing control; backstepping for turbulent flows and MHD systems; ISS to boundary inputs and small-gain theorems for PDEs; nonlinear predictors and delay-adaptive control; prescribed-time stabilization; high relative degree CBFs, ISSf gain assignment, stochastic non-overshooting control, and inverse optimal safety filters; and universal approximability theory for PDE backstepping with stability guarantees under machine-learning by neural operators.

Krstić has served as Editor-in-Chief of the Elsevier journal Systems & Control Letters from 2018 till 2025 and as a Senior Editor of the International Federation of Automatic Control's (IFAC) journal Automatica from 2005 till 2025. On January 1, 2026, he became Editor-in-Chief of the IEEE Transactions on Automatic Control.

== Industry work ==
Krstić has contributed to technologies in extreme ultraviolet lithography, advanced arresting gear for Ford-class carriers, laser spectroscopy on NASA's Curiosity (rover) on Mars, particle accelerators, oil drilling, nuclear fusion, and Li-ion battery systems. Among the living mechanical and aerospace engineers in the U.S., Krstić is ranked seventh by ScholarGPS and is the tenth highest cited in the U.S. according to Research.com as of November 2026.

A 2002 extremum seeking (ES) article by Krstić and his students introduced an algorithm that, along with additional features, was employed in the US Patent 8,598,552 B1 by his 2012 PhD graduate Paul Frihauf and his collaborators at Cymer Inc in 2013. This patent helped stabilize EUV light sources and reduced the chip resolution from 193 nm to 13 nm.

From 2014 to 2019, Krstić led development of control systems for the Advanced Arresting Gear on the USS Gerald R. Ford (CVN-78) aircraft carrier, through his consultancy with General Atomics.

Krstić's ES methods were adopted at major accelerator labs including Los Alamos, CERN, and DESY, reducing re-tuning time significantly.

An MS thesis supervised by Krstić developed a backup method for the autofocus algorithm of the ChemCam on NASA's Curiosity (rover) on Mars.

Krstić's work has been applied to downhole pressure sensing at Equinor, battery estimation with Bosch and ARPA-E, fusion control at General Atomics, HCCI engine optimization at Lawrence Livermore National Laboratory, and jet engine stabilization at United Technologies. He also developed controls for Northrop Grumman for UAV endurance and for the Navy's T-craft vessel.

== Awards ==
Krstić is a Fellow of seven scholarly societies: Institute of Electrical and Electronics Engineers (IEEE, 2002), International Federation of Automatic Control (IFAC), Society for Industrial and Applied Mathematics (SIAM), American Society of Mechanical Engineers (ASME), American Institute of Aeronautics and Astronautics (AIAA), American Association for the Advancement of Science (AAAS, 2017), and UK's Institution of Engineering and Technology (IET). He has also received the following other awards:

- IEEE Roger W. Brockett Control Systems Award (2026)
- Foreign Member, Academia Europaea (2026)
- French National Centre for Scientific Research (CNRS) Fellow-Ambassador (2025)
- IEEE Hendrik W. Bode Lecture Prize (2023, announced in 2022)
- AACC Richard E. Bellman Control Heritage Award (2021)
- USC Viterbi School of Engineering A. V. "Bal" Balakrishnan Award for Excellence in Scientific Research (inaugural recipient, 2022)
- SIAM W. T. and Idalia Reid Prize (2019)
- IEEE Control Systems Society Distinguished Member Award (2018)
- Foreign Member, Serbian Academy of Sciences and Arts (2018)
- ASME Rufus Oldenburger Medal (2017)
- AACC John R. Ragazzini Education Award (2017)
- ASME Henry Paynter Outstanding Investigator Award (2016)
- ASME Nyquist Lecture (2015)
- IFAC Harold Chestnut Control Engineering Textbook Prize (2014)
- Presidential Early Career Award for Scientists and Engineers (2000)
- Office of Naval Research Young Investigator Award (2000)
- National Science Foundation CAREER Award (2000)
- IFAC technical committee awards:
  - IFAC TC Delay Systems Lifetime Achievement Award
  - IFAC TC Award on Adaptive and Learning Systems (2023)
  - IFAC TC Distributed Parameter Systems Ruth F. Curtain Award (inaugural recipient, 2022)
  - IFAC TC Award on Non-Linear Control Systems (2019)
- First engineering recipient of the UC San Diego Chancellor's Associates Award for Excellence in Science & Engineering Research (immediately following the Nobel laureate Roger Tsien)
- IEEE Control Systems Society George Axelby Outstanding Paper Award of the IEEE Transactions on Automatic Control (1998)
- AACC O. Hugo Schuck Best Paper Award for a paper in the American Control Conference (1996 and 2019)
- Best student paper award, American Control Conference (1995)
- Best student paper award, IEEE Conference on Decision and Control (1993)
- Visiting Miller Professorship Award, Miller Institute for Basic Research in Science, University of California, Berkeley

== Books ==
1. Nonlinear and Adaptive Control Design (1995), co-authored with Ioannis Kanellakopoulos and Petar Kokotovic; John Wiley and Sons. ISBN 0-471-12732-9
2. Stabilization of Nonlinear Uncertain Systems (1998), co-authored with Hua Deng; Springer. ISBN 1-85233-020-1
3. Flow Control by Feedback (2002), co-authored with Ole Morten Aamo; Springer. ISBN 1-85233-669-2
4. Real-Time Optimization by Extremum Seeking Feedback (2003), co-authored with Kartik B. Ariyur; John Wiley and Sons. ISBN 0-471-46859-2
5. Control of Turbulent and Magnetohydrodynamic Channel Flows (2007), co-authored with Rafael Vazquez; Birkhauser. ISBN 978-0-8176-4698-1
6. Boundary Control of PDEs: A Course on Backstepping Designs (2008), co-authored with Andrey Smyshlyaev; SIAM. ISBN 978-0-89871-650-4
7. Delay Compensation for Nonlinear, Adaptive, and PDE Systems (2009); Birkhauser. ISBN 978-0-8176-4698-1
8. Adaptive Control of Parabolic PDEs (2010), co-authored with Andrey Smyshlyaev; Princeton University Press. ISBN 978-0691142869
9. Stochastic Averaging and Stochastic Extremum Seeking (2012), co-authored with Shu-Jun Liu; Springer. ISBN 978-1-4471-4086-3
10. Nonlinear Control Under Nonconstant Delays (2013), co-authored with Nikolaos Bekiaris-Liberis; SIAM. ISBN 978-1-61197-284-9
11. Predictor Feedback for Delay Systems: Implementations and Approximations (2017), coauthored with Iasson Karafyllis; Birkhauser, ISBN 978-3-319-42377-7
12. Model-Free Stabilization by Extremum Seeking (2017), co-authored with Alexander Scheinker; Springer. ISBN 978-3-319-50790-3
13. Input-to-State Stability for PDEs (2018), co-authored with Iasson Karafyllis; Springer. ISBN 978-3-319-91011-6
14. Delay-Adaptive Linear Control (2019), co-authored with Yang Zhu; Princeton University Press. ISBN 9780691202549
15. Materials Phase Change PDE Control & Estimation: From Additive Manufacturing to Polar Ice (2020), co-authored with Shumon Koga; Springer. ISBN 978-3-030-58490-0
16. PDE Control of String-Actuated Motion (2022); co-authored with Ji Wang, Princeton University Press. ISBN 9780691233499
17. Extremum Seeking through Delays and PDEs (2022), co-authored with Tiago Roux Oliveira, SIAM. ISBN 978-1-61197-734-9
18. Traffic Congestion Control by PDE Backstepping (2023), co-authored with Huan Yu, Birkhäuser. ISBN 978-3-031-19345-3
19. Robust Adaptive Control: Deadzone-Adapted Disturbance Suppression (2025), co-authored with Iasson Karafyllis, ISBN 978-1-61197-842-1

== See also ==
- List of people in systems and control
