= Harold Chestnut =

American engineer (1917–2001)

- Born: November 25, 1917; Albany, New York
- Died: August 29, 2001 (aged 83); Schenectady, New York
- Citizenship: American
- Awards: Richard E. Bellman Control Heritage Award (1985); Rufus Oldenburger Medal (1990)
- Scientific career
- Fields: Control theory

Harold (Hall) Chestnut (November 25, 1917 – August 29, 2001) was an American electrical engineer, control engineer and manager at General Electric and author, who helped establish the fields of control theory and systems engineering.

== Biography ==
He was born in Albany, New York, where his father, educated as a civil engineer, and worked in the family candy business. Chestnut was raised in the 1920s and went on a scholarship to MIT in 1934 to study chemical engineering. In the first year he was awarded for his outstanding performance in chemistry, but switched anyway to electrical engineering and became co-op student. After five years of study he received a combined B.S. and M.S. degree in electrical engineering in 1940. Chestnut received further on-the-job training in General Electric's Advanced Engineering Program (AEP). Later in his career he received two honorary doctorates in engineering, in 1966 from Case Institute of Technology in 1972 from Villanova University.

In 1940 Chestnut began a lifelong career with General Electric, which would last until his retirement in 1983. He married Erma Ruth Callaway Chestnut in 1944 and they had three sons. During the Second World War, Chestnut was both a student and an instructor in General Electric's well-known Advanced Engineering Program. He worked on the design of the central fire-control system and remotely controlled gun turrets used on the B-29 aircraft.

Later he worked in the Aeronautics and Ordnance Department and the Systems Engineering and Analysis branch of the Advanced Technology Laboratory, where he served as manager from 1956 to 1972. Here he worked on a wide variety of technical problems including reliability issues in rapid transit and the Apollo mission to the moon. Later in his career he returned to the field of electric power. This time the focus was power systems automation.

From 1957 to 1959 he was the first president of the International Federation of Automatic Control (IFAC). After his term as president, he chaired the technical board from 1961 to 1966 and the Systems Engineering technical committee for another three years. He served as honorary editor from 1969 to 1972 and was the first adviser appointed for life in 1984. Chestnut was also involved in the IEEE since its establishment in 1963 and served as its president in 1973. He was active in the formation of the IEEE History Center and the International Federation of Automatic Control.

In 1961 Chestnut edited Automatica: The International Journal on Automatic Control and Automation. He also became editor of a John Wiley book series on systems engineering and analysis. In this series Chestnut published his own books.

In the 1980s and 1990s, after retirement, he created the "Supplemental Ways of Improving International Stability (SWIIS) Foundation" to identify and implement "supplemental ways to improve international stability". He devoted those years to this effort, in which he applied principles from the control field, such as stability and feedback, to international political realities.

Harold Chestnut received many awards: In 1966 he received an Honorary Doctorate in engineering from Case Western Reserve University and in 1972 from Villanova University. In 1984 he won the IEEE Centennial Medal and in 1985 the AACC's Richard E. Bellman Control Heritage Award. In 1981 he received the prestigious Honda Prize for ecotechnology, which included a substantial financial award from the Japan’s Honda Foundation. He was also named a Fellow of the AIEE, ISA, and AAAS. He was elected to the US National Academy of Engineering in 1974 and selected as a Case Centennial Scholar in 1980.

In 1998 Harold Chestnut and the Chestnut Family provided a gift to IFAC for the IFAC Textbook Prize. The income from this donation funds the award for an outstanding textbook author recognized at each IFAC Congress.

== Work ==
Harold Chestnut worked in the fields of Control system, control theory and systems engineering.

== Publications ==
Harold Chestnut published several articles and books, including:

- 1951. Servomechanisms and Regulating Systems Design. Vol. 1, with R.W. Mayer, Wiley.
- 1955. Servomechanisms and Regulating Systems Design. Vol. 2, with R.W. Mayer, Wiley.
- 1965. Systems Engineering Tools. Wiley.
- 1967. Systems Engineering Methods. Wiley.

Articles:

- 1970. "Information requirements for systems understanding". In: IEEE Trans. Syst. Sci. Cybern.. Vol. SSC-6. pp. 3–12, Jan. 1970.

== See also ==
- Automatic control
- Systems engineering
