= Arjan van der Schaft =

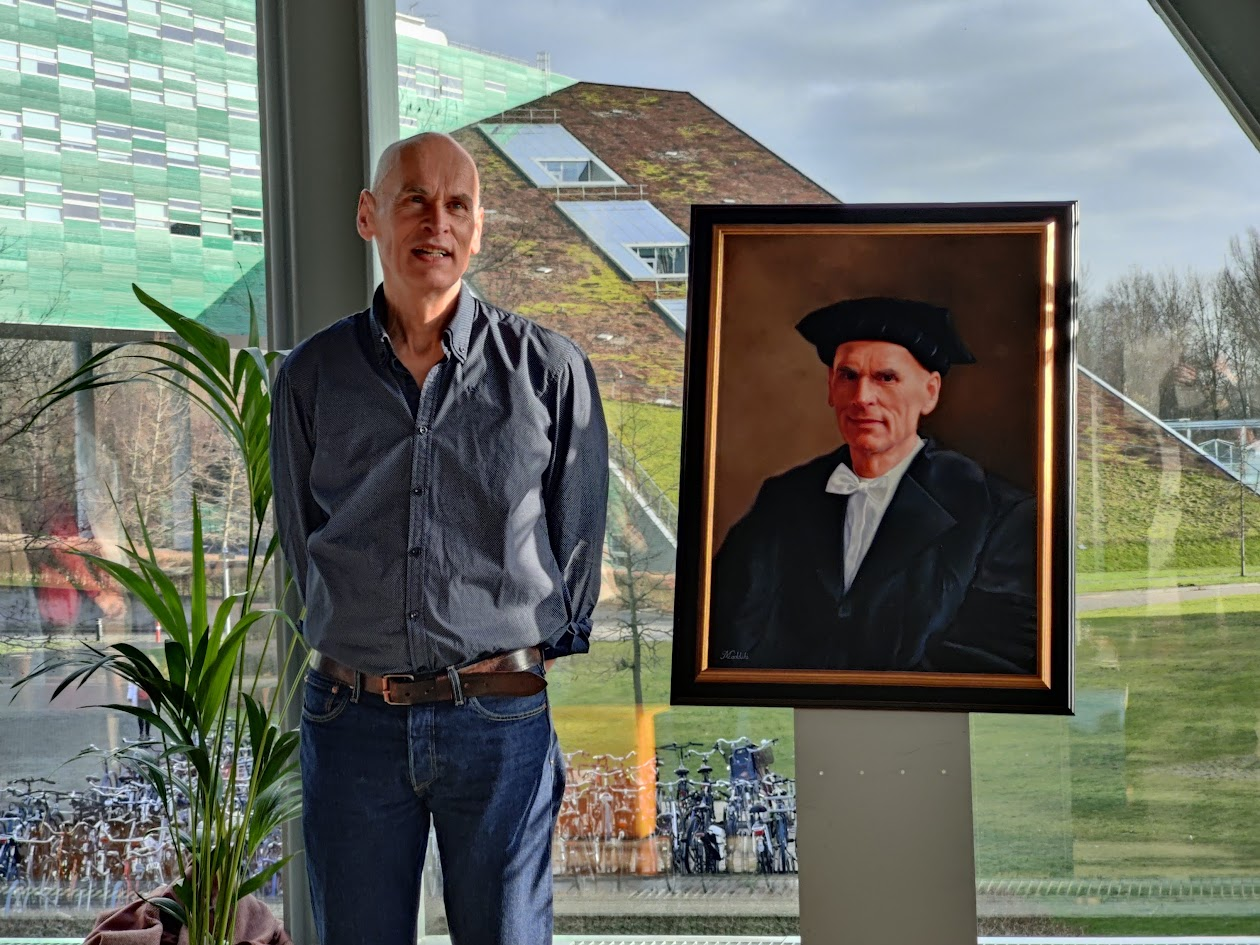
- Van der Schaft and his portrait
- Born: Abraham Jan (Arjan) van der Schaft; February 10, 1955; Vlaardingen, The Netherlands
- Other name: A.J. van der Schaft
- Citizenship: Dutch
- Education: Ph.D. in Mathematics
- Alma mater: University of Groningen
- Known for: Port-Hamiltonian Systems, Nonlinear Control, Dissipative Systems, Nonlinear H∞ Control, Hybrid Systems
- Scientific career
- Fields: Mathematics, Engineering
- Workplaces: University of Groningen (2005,-), University of Twente (1982, 2005)
- Thesis: System theoretic descriptions of physical systems (1983)
- Doctoral advisor: Jan Camiel Willems
- Website: www.rug.nl/staff/a.j.van.der.schaft/

Abraham Jan (Arjan) van der Schaft (born 1955) is an emeritus professor of systems and control theory at University of Groningen. He is most noted for his contributions to nonlinear control and port-Hamiltonian systems theory.

== Career ==
Arjan van der Schaft was born in Vlaardingen in 1955. He studied mathematics at the University of Groningen, and obtained the Ph.D. degree from the University of Groningen in 1983. He was an assistant professor (1982-1987), associate professor (1987–2000), and full professor (2000–2005) in mathematical systems and control theory at the University of Twente, before becoming professor in mathematics at the University of Groningen in 2005. In 2022 he became emeritus professor.

== Research contributions ==
Arjan van der Schaft is a mathematical system theorist, who is most known for his contributions to nonlinear systems and control and the creation (with B. Maschke) of port-Hamiltonian systems theory. The latter provides a unified framework for the modeling, control, and simulation of complex multi-physics systems. His contributions to nonlinear control range from geometric nonlinear control and input-output Hamiltonian systems, to the development of nonlinear H-infinity control theory. He was among the first to initiate hybrid systems and bisimulations within systems and control.

== Awards and honors ==
Van der Schaft is the 2027 recipient of the prestigious IEEE Roger W. Brockett Control Systems Award, a Fellow of IFAC (2016), third recipient (2013) of the three-yearly Award on Non-Linear Control Systems of the IFAC Technical Committee on Non-Linear Systems, and Life Fellow of IEEE. He is co-recipient of the SICE Takeda Best Paper Prize 2008, the IEEE Transactions on Control Systems Technology Outstanding Paper Award 2020, and of the IFAC High Impact Paper Award 2026. He was invited speaker at the International Congress of Mathematicians 2006.

== Books ==
- System Theoretic Descriptions of Physical Systems (1984)
- Variational and Hamiltonian Control Systems (1987; with P.E. Crouch)
- Nonlinear Dynamical Control Systems (1990; 2nd ed 2016, with H. Nijmeijer)
- L_{2}-Gain and Passivity Techniques in Nonlinear Control (1996; 3rd ed 2017)
- An Introduction to Hybrid Dynamical Systems (2000; end ed 2024, with J.M. Schumacher)
- Port-Hamiltonian Systems Theory; an Introductory Survey (2014, with D. Jeltsema)
- A Course on Optimal Control (2023 with G. Meinsma)

== Selected publications ==
- ‘L2-gain analysis of nonlinear systems and nonlinear state feedback H-infinity control’ (IEEE Transactions Automatic Control, 1992)
- ‘On the Hamiltonian formulation of energy conserving physical systems with external ports’, (AEU-Int. J. Electronics and Communications, 1995, with B. Maschke)
- ‘Interconnection and damping assignment passivity-based control of port-controlled Hamiltonian systems’ (Automatica, 2002, with R. Ortega, B. Maschke, G. Escobar)
- ‘Hamiltonian formulation of distributed-parameter systems with boundary energy flow’ (J. Geometry and Physics, 2002, with B. Maschke).
- ‘Equivalence of dynamical systems by bisimulation’ (IEEE Transactions Automatic Control, 2004)
- ‘On the mathematical structure of balanced chemical reaction networks governed by mass action kinetics’ (SIAM J. Applied Mathematics, 2013, with S. Rao, B. Jayawardhana)
- ‘A unifying energy-based approach to stability of power grids with market dynamics’ (IEEE Transactions Automatic Control, 2016, with T. Stegink, C. De Persis)
- ‘Geometry of thermodynamic processes’ (Entropy, 2018, with B. Maschke).
