= Manfred Morari =

- Born: 1951 (age 74–75)
- Awards: Donald P. Eckman Award (1980); NSF Presidential Young Investigator Award (1984); AIChE Colburn Award (1984); Curtis W. McGraw Research Award (1989); U.S. National Academy of Engineering membership,(1993); IEEE Control Systems Award (2005); Richard E. Bellman Control Heritage Award (2011); Fellow of IEEE
- Scientific career
- Fields: Control theory
- Workplaces: University of Wisconsin, Madison, California Institute of Technology, ETH Zurich, University of Pennsylvania
- Notable students: James C. Liao

Manfred Morari (born 1951) is a Practice Professor at the University of Pennsylvania. He received his Ph.D. in Chemical Engineering from the University of Minnesota in 1977. Morari held positions at the University of Wisconsin, Madison from 1977 to 1983, the California Institute of Technology from 1983 to 1991, and the Swiss Federal Institute of Technology in Zurich ETH Zurich. His research areas include Model Predictive Control, Control of Hybrid Systems, Internal Model Control (IMC), and robust control, .

He received in 2005 the IEEE Control Systems Award, and in 2011 the Richard E. Bellman Control Heritage Award.
