= Lennart Ljung (engineer) =

Swedish control theorist

- Born: 13 September 1946 (age 79); Malmö, Sweden
- Citizenship: Sweden
- Education: Lund University
- Known for: System Identification
- Awards: IEEE Fellow; IEEE Control Systems Award
- Scientific career
- Fields: Control Theory
- Workplaces: Linköping University; Lund University; Massachusetts Institute of Technology; Stanford University
- Doctoral advisor: Karl Johan Åström

Lennart Ljung is a Swedish professor in the Chair of Control Theory at Linköping University 1976–2011, after which he continued as professor emeritus. He is known for his pioneering research in system identification, and is regarded as a leading researcher in control theory.

== Education ==
Lennart Ljung received the B.A. in Russian Language and Mathematics 1967, the M.Sc. (first degree) in Engineering Physics 1970, and the Ph.D. in Control Theory 1974, all from Lund University.

== Background, Present Appointments and Scientific Contributions ==
Following a position as a research associate at Stanford University 1974–1975 and a position as an associate professor (docent) in control theory at Lund University in 1975–1976, Lennart Ljung was elected as a professor in the chair of control theory at Linköping University in 1976. He was a visiting researcher at Stanford University 1980–1981 and at Massachusetts Institute of Technology 1985–1986. He was also Department Head of the Department of Electrical Engineering, Linköping University between 1981 and 1990. He is currently the Director of the MOVIII Strategic Research Center at Linköping University. He has made extensive contributions to control theory, particularly in the area of system identification. He has authored 10 books, over 150 international journal articles, over 200 international conference papers, and a widely used commercial software package for MATLAB called the System Identification Toolbox.

Lennart Ljung is ranked 84 in the world (1st within Sweden) in the field of Engineering and Technology.

== Notable honors and awards ==
- IEEE Fellow (1985)
- Member of the Royal Swedish Academy of Engineering Sciences (1985)
- Member of the Swedish Academy of Sciences (1995)
- Doctor honoris causa Baltic State Technical University (1996)
- Doctor honoris causa Uppsala University (1998)
- Honorary Member of the Hungarian Academy of Engineering Sciences (2001)
- Giorgio Quazza Medal (2002)
- Hendrik W. Bode Lecture Prize, awarded by IEEE Control Systems Society (2003)
- Foreign Associate of the United States National Academy of Engineering (2004)
- Doctor honoris causa Universite de Technologie de Troyes (2004)
- Doctor honoris causa Katholieke Universiteit Leuven (2004)
- IEEE Control Systems Award (2007)
- Doctor honoris causa Helsinki University of Technology (2008)
- Large Gold Medal of the Royal Swedish Academy of Engingeering Sciences (2018)

== See also ==
- System Identification
- Control Theory
- Electrical Engineering
