= Richard M. Murray =

Control theorist and synthetic biologist

- Education: University of California at Berkeley, California Institute of Technology
- Scientific career
- Fields: Synthetic biology
- Workplaces: California Institute of Technology
- Thesis: (1991)
- Website: www.cds.caltech.edu/~murray/wiki/Main_Page

External videos
- “Richard Murray”, IEEE Robotics and Automation Society Robotics History Project.

Richard M. Murray is a synthetic biologist and Thomas E. and Doris Everhart Professor of Control & Dynamical Systems and Bioengineering at Caltech, California. He was elected to the National Academy of Engineering in 2013 for "contributions in control theory and networked control systems with applications to aerospace engineering, robotics, and autonomy". Murray is a co-author of several textbooks on feedback and control systems, and helped to develop the Python Control Systems Library to provide operations for use in feedback control systems. He was a founding member of the Department of Defense's Defense Innovation Advisory Board as of 2016.

== Education ==
Murray received a BS in electrical engineering from California Institute of Technology (Caltech) in 1985. He received a MS (1988) and PhD (1990) from the University of California, Berkeley.

== Career ==
Murray joined Caltech in 1991 as an assistant professor of mechanical engineering. He became an associate professor in 1997, a professor in 2000, and the Everhart Professor of Control and Dynamical Systems in 2006. He was named the Everhart Professor of Control and Dynamical Systems and Bioengineering in 2009. He has served as Chair of the Division of Engineering and Applied Science (2000–2005) and Director of Information Science and Technology (2006–2009).

== Research ==
Murray is a pioneer of the field of biological engineering, synthetic biology and control theory including feedback in networked control systems, biomolecular feedback, engineered biological circuits, and novel architectures.

Murray is a founder and steering group member of the Build-a-Cell Initiative, an international collaboration investigating creation of synthetic live cells. He is a co-founder of Tierra Biosciences, for cell-free synthetic biology.

== Books ==
- Murray, Richard M.; Li, Zexiang; Sastry, S. Shankar; Sastry, Shankar (1994). A mathematical introduction to robotic manipulation (PDF). Boca Raton, Fla London: CRC Press. ISBN 978-0849379819.
- Murray, Richard M. (2003). Control in an information rich world: report of the Panel on Future Directions in Control, Dynamics, and Systems. Philadelphia: Society for Industrial and Applied Mathematics. ISBN 0898715288.
- Åström, Karl J.; Murray, Richard M. (2008). Feedback systems: an introduction for scientists and engineers (PDF). Princeton, NJ: Princeton Univ. Press. ISBN 978-0-691-13576-2.
- Del Vecchio, Domitilla; Murray, Richard M. (2015). Biomolecular feedback systems. Princeton (N.J.): Princeton university press. ISBN 9780691161532. JSTOR j.ctt7zvcfh.

== Awards and honors ==
- 2019, John R. Ragazzini Award
- 2017, IEEE Control Systems Award, Institute of Electrical and Electronics Engineers
- 2013, National Academy of Engineering for "contributions in control theory and networked control systems with applications to aerospace engineering, robotics, and autonomy".
- 2007, honorary doctorate, Lund University
- 2005–2006, Richard P. Feynman Prize for Excellence in Teaching, Caltech
- 1997, Donald P. Eckman Award, American Automatic Control Council
- 1995, NSF Early Faculty Development Award
