= Kalman–Yakubovich–Popov lemma =

The Kalman–Yakubovich–Popov lemma is a result in system analysis and control theory which states: Given a number $\gamma > 0$, two n-vectors B, C and an n x n Hurwitz matrix A, if the pair $(A,B)$ is completely controllable, then a symmetric matrix P and a vector Q satisfying

$$A^T P + P A = -Q Q^T$$

$$P B-C = \sqrt{\gamma}Q$$

exist if and only if

$$\gamma+2 Re[C^T (j\omega I-A)^{-1}B]\ge 0$$

Moreover, the set $\{x: x^T P x = 0\}$ is the unobservable subspace for the pair $(C,A)$.

The lemma can be seen as a generalization of the Lyapunov equation in stability theory. It establishes a relation between a linear matrix inequality involving the state space constructs A, B, C and a condition in the frequency domain.

The Kalman–Popov–Yakubovich lemma which was first formulated and proved in 1962 by Vladimir Andreevich Yakubovich where it was stated that for the strict frequency inequality. The case of nonstrict frequency inequality was published in 1963 by Rudolf E. Kálmán. In that paper the relation to solvability of the Lur’e equations was also established. Both papers considered scalar-input systems. The constraint on the control dimensionality was removed in 1964 by Gantmakher and Yakubovich and independently by Vasile Mihai Popov. Extensive reviews of the topic can be found in and in Chapter 3 of.

== Multivariable Kalman–Yakubovich–Popov lemma ==
Given $A \in \R^{n \times n}, B \in \R^{n \times m}, M = M^T \in \R^{(n+m) \times (n+m)}$ with $\det(j\omega I - A) \ne 0$ for all $\omega \in \R$ and $(A, B)$ controllable, the following are equivalent:

1. for all $\omega \in \R \cup \{\infty\}$
  $$\left[\begin{matrix} (j\omega I - A)^{-1}B \\ I \end{matrix}\right]^*   M   \left[\begin{matrix} (j\omega I - A)^{-1}B \\ I \end{matrix}\right] \le 0$$
2. there exists a matrix $P \in \R^{n \times n}$ such that $P = P^T$ and
  $$M + \left[\begin{matrix} A^T P + PA & PB \\ B^T P & 0 \end{matrix}\right] \le 0.$$

The corresponding equivalence for strict inequalities holds even if $(A, B)$ is not controllable.
