= John Flavell Coales =

John Flavell Coales CBE, FRS (14 September 1907 – 6 June 1999) was a British physicist and engineer. He started the Borehamwood laboratory of the Elliott Brothers company in 1946.

Coales graduated in 1929 from Sydney Sussex College, Cambridge and joined the British Admiralty, working in the experimental department of the Signal School, Portsmouth. He later worked on radio direction finding and centimetre-band radar used for naval gunnery. In 1946 he was awarded the OBE for his wartime work on naval radar. That year he left the Admiralty and became director of the Elliot Brothers research laboratory. Coales made significant contributions to automatic process control, and was a pioneer in the use of digital computers for real-time control. In 1957 he was a founder of the International Federation of Automatic Control.

In 1970 he was made a Fellow of the Royal Society. He served as President of the Institution of Electrical Engineers in 1971. In 1974 he was invested as a Commander of the Order of the British Empire.

Coales married in 1936 and had two sons and two daughters.

In 1928-9, as an undergraduate he co-founded The Round, the Cambridge University English Country Dancing Club.
