= Kumpati S. Narendra =

American control theorist

- Citizenship: American
- Education: Harvard University
- Awards: Richard E. Bellman Control Heritage Award (2003)
- Scientific career
- Fields: Control theory, Neural Networks, Learning Automata
- Thesis: Synthesis of Linear Feedback Systems through Pole Zero Configurations
- Doctoral advisor: Philippe Le Corbeiller
- Doctoral students: Yu-Chi Ho

Kumpati S. Narendra is an American control theorist, who currently holds the Harold W. Cheel Professorship of Electrical Engineering at Yale University. He received the Richard E. Bellman Control Heritage Award in 2003. He is noted "for pioneering contributions to stability theory, adaptive and learning systems theory." He is also well recognized for his research work towards learning including Neural Networks and Learning Automata.

Narendra obtained his Ph.D. at Harvard University in 1959. He has been the advisor of 47 doctoral students and 35 postdoctoral and visiting fellows. Of the 47 students, four were at Harvard University and thirty nine were at Yale University. Four others who completed their work under his direction received their degrees from other universities.

== Research areas ==
- Nonlinear dynamical systems
- Artificial neural networks
- Learning automata
- Adaptive control
- Stability theory

== Honors and awards ==
- Franklin V. Taylor Award (IEEE SMC Society), 1972
- Fellow, IEEE, 1979
- Fellow, IEE (UK), 1981
- George S. Axelby Outstanding Paper Award (IEEE Control Systems Society), 1988
- John R. Ragazzini Award (American Automatic Control Council), 1990
- Outstanding Paper Award of the Neural Network Council (IEEE), 1991
- Neural Network Leadership Award (International Neural Network Society), 1994
- Distinguished Visiting Scientist (Jet Propulsion Laboratory), 1994-1995
- The Bode Prize/Lecture (IEEE Control Systems Society), 1995
- (Honorary) Doctor of Science (Anna University, formerly University of Madras), 1995
- Distinguished Speaker (Texas A&M), 1997
- Life Fellow (IEEE), 1997
- Distinguished Speaker (University of Virginia), 2001
- Harold W. Cheel Professor of Electrical Engineering (Yale University), 2003
- Richard E. Bellman Control Heritage Award (AACC), 2003
- Walton Fellow, Ireland (2007)
- (Honorary) Doctor of Science (University of Ireland, Maynooth), 2007
- Neural Networks Pioneer Award (IEEE Computational Intelligence Society), 2008
