= Graham Goodwin =

Australian engineer (born 1945)

Graham Clifford Goodwin AO (born 20 April 1945 Broken Hill, New South Wales) is an Australian Laureate Professor of Electrical Engineering at the University of Newcastle, Australia.

== Life ==
Graham Goodwin is an Emeritus Laureate Professor of Electrical Engineering at the University of Newcastle. His education includes B.Sc., B.E. and Ph.D. from the University of New South Wales. He won the 1990 M A Sargent Medal, Engineers Australia. In 2010 he was awarded the IEEE Control Systems Field Award and in 2013 he received the Rufus T. Oldenburger Medal from the American Society of Mechanical Engineers. He was twice awarded the International Federation of Automatic Control triannual Best Engineering Text Book Prize. He is a Fellow of IEEE for contribution to adaptive control and system identification; an Honorary Fellow of Institute of Engineers, Australia; a Fellow of the International Federation of Automatic Control, a Fellow of the Australian Academy of Science; a Fellow of the Australian Academy of Technology, Science and Engineering; a Member of the International Statistical Institute; a Fellow of the Royal Society, London and a Foreign Member of the Royal Swedish Academy of Sciences. He holds Honorary Doctorates from Lund Institute of Technology, Sweden and the Technion Israel. Goodwin was appointed an Officer of the Order of Australia in the 2021 Australia Day Honours for "distinguished service to tertiary education, and to electrical engineering, as an academic and researcher, and to scientific academies".

He is the co-author of ten books, four edited books, and five hundred papers. He holds 16 International Patents covering rolling mill technology, telecommunications, mine planning and mineral exploration. His current research interests include power electronics, boiler control systems and management of Type 1 diabetes.

== Books ==
1. C.B. Speedy, R.F. Brown and G.C. Goodwin,” Control Theory: Identification and Optimal Control” Oliver and Boyd, 1970.

2. G.C. Goodwin and R.L. Payne, “Dynamic System Identification: Experiment Design and Data Analysis” Academic Press 1977.

3. G.C. Goodwin and K.S. Sin, “Adaptive Filtering, Prediction and Control” Prentice Hall, 1984

4. R.H. Middleton and G.C. Goodwin, “Digital Control and Estimation: A Unified Approach’ Prentice Hall 1990.

5. A. Feuer and G.C. Goodwin, “Sampling in Digital Signal Processing and Control”, Birkhausser, 1996

6. M.M. Seron, J.H. Braslavsky and G.C. Goodwin, “Fundamental Limitation in Filtering and Control”, Springer, 1997.

7. G.C. Goodwin, S.F. Graebe and M.E. Salgado, “Control System Design” Prentice Hall, 2001.

8. G.C. Goodwin, M.M. Seron, “Constrained Control and Estimation” Springer 2005

9. Y.I Yuz and G.C. Goodwin, “Sampled-Data Models for Linear and Nonlinear Systems” Springer, 2014.

10. G.C. Goodwin and S.F. Graebe, “A Doctorate and Beyond: Building a Career in Engineering and the Physical Sciences”, Springer 2017.

11. A. Medioli and G.C. Goodwin, “Practical Control System Design: Real World Designs Implemented on Emulated Industrial Systems”, Wiley 2024.
