= Alberto Isidori =

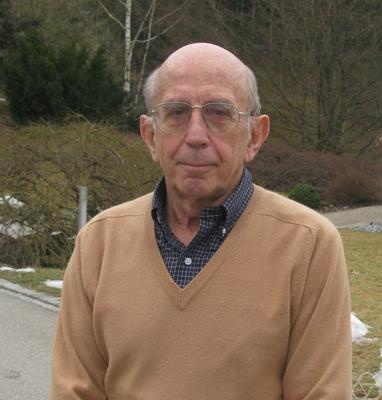
Alberto Isidori

Alberto Isidori (born January 24, 1942, in Rapallo) is an Italian control theorist. He is a professor of automatic control at the University of Rome and an affiliate professor of electrical and systems engineering at the McKelvey School of Engineering at Washington University in St. Louis. He is the author of the book Nonlinear Control Systems, a highly cited reference in nonlinear control.

He is a Fellow of the IEEE and IFAC. He received the 1996 IFAC Georgio Quazza Medal, and was named as the recipient of the 2012 IEEE Control Systems Award.

== Publications ==
- Isidori, A. (1995). Nonlinear Control Systems. Springer. ISBN 978-3-540-19916-8.
