= A. Stephen Morse =

American engineering professor (born 1939)

- Born: June 18, 1939 (age 87); Mt. Vernon, New York, U.S.
- Education: Cornell University; Purdue University
- Known for: Contributions to geometric control theory, adaptive control, and the stability of hybrid systems
- Awards: Richard E. Bellman Control Heritage Award (2013); IEEE Control Systems Award (1999)
- Scientific career
- Fields: Control theory
- Workplaces: Office of Control Theory and Application at the NASA Electronics Research Center, Cambridge, Massachusetts (1967-1970); Yale University (1970 - )
- Thesis: On the Analysis and Synthesis of Control Systems Using a Worst Case Disturbance Approach
- Doctoral advisor: Violet B. Haas
- Notable students: Ali Jadbabaie (postdoc); Daniel Liberzon (postdoc)

A. Stephen Morse (born June 18, 1939) is the Dudley Professor of distributed control and adaptive control in electrical engineering at Yale University.

== Early life and education ==
Morse was born in Mt. Vernon, New York. He received his B.S. from Cornell University, his M.S. from the University of Arizona, and his Ph.D. from Purdue University.

== Awards ==
Morse received the IEEE Control Systems Award and the Richard E. Bellman Control Heritage Award in 1999 and 2013, respectively. Morse was elected a member of the National Academy of Engineering in 2002 for contributions to geometric control theory, adaptive control, and the stability of hybrid systems.

== See also ==
- List of members of the National Academy of Engineering (Electronics)
