= International Federation of Automatic Control =

Automation engineering organization

- IFAC
- Abbreviation: IFAC
- Formation: 1957
- Type: INGO
- Headquarters: Laxenburg (Austria)
- Region served: Worldwide
- Official language: English
- Website: IFAC Official website

The International Federation of Automatic Control (IFAC), founded in September 1957 in France, is a multinational federation of 49 national member organizations, each one representing the engineering and scientific societies concerned with automatic control in its own country.

The aim of IFAC is to promote the science and technology of control in the broadest sense in all systems, whether, for example, engineering, physical, biological, social or economic, in both theory and application. IFAC is also concerned with the impact of control technology on society.

IFAC pursues its purpose by organizing technical meetings, by publications, and by any other means consistent with its constitution and which will enhance the interchange and circulation of information on automatic control activities.

International World Congresses are held every three years. Between congresses, IFAC sponsors many symposia, conferences and workshops covering particular aspects of automatic control.

The official journals of IFAC are Automatica, Control Engineering Practice, Annual Reviews in Control, Journal of Process Control, Engineering Applications of Artificial Intelligence, the Journal of Mechatronics, Nonlinear Analysis: Hybrid Systems, and the IFAC Journal of Systems and Control.

== Awards ==
Major Medals include the Giorgio Quazza Medal.

=== TC Award on Non-Linear Control Systems ===
The IFAC TC Award on Non-Linear Control Systems is an award given by the IFAC Technical Committee on Non-Linear Control Systems to recognize individuals who have made outstanding technical contributions in the nonlinear control area and also have supplied remarkable service to IFAC. Both theoretical contributions and industrial applications in control systems are relevant for this IFAC award. The award is given in honor of Alberto Isidori, a distinguished pioneer in the fundamental research, education, and service to the field of nonlinear control systems. The award is presented during the IFAC Symposium on Nonlinear Control Systems (NOLCOS) every three years.

The IFAC TC Award on Non-Linear Control Systems is the continuation of the Certificate of Excellent Achievements given since 2007.

Recipients have included:

- 2007: Alberto Isidori
- 2010: Arthur J. Krener
- 2013: Arjan Van der Schaft
- 2016: Andrew Teel
- 2019: Miroslav Krstić
- 2022: Eduardo D. Sontag
- 2025: Laurent Praly

== See also ==
- American Automatic Control Council
- List of people in systems and control
- List of engineering awards
- Giorgio Quazza Medal
- IEEE Control Systems Award
- Hendrik W. Bode Lecture Prize
- Richard E. Bellman Control Heritage Award
- Rufus Oldenburger Medal
- Harold Chestnut
- Karl Reinisch
- Li Huatian
- John C. Lozier
