= Pramod P. Khargonekar =

Indian electrical engineer

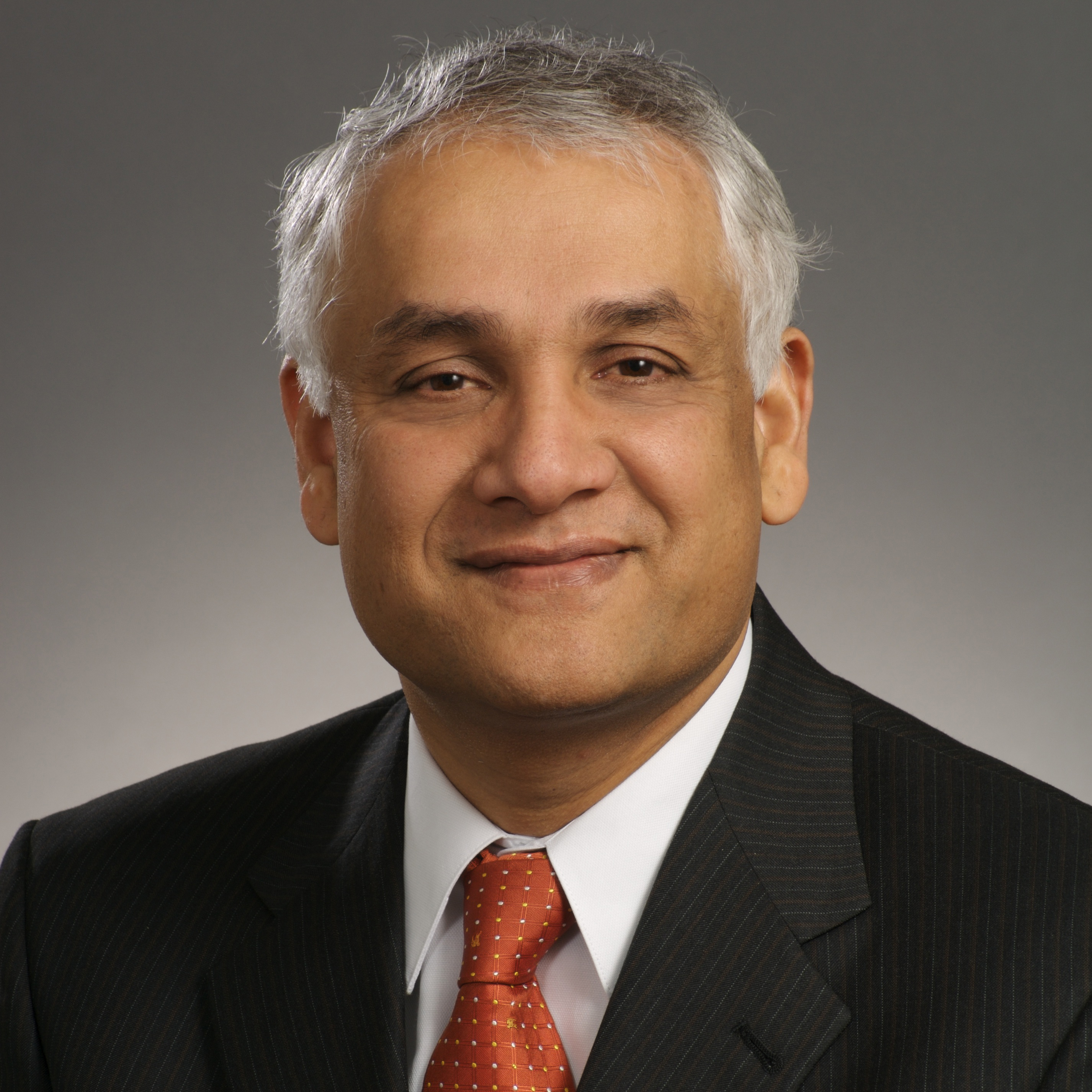
- Citizenship: American
- Education: University of Florida, Indian Institute of Technology Bombay
- Known for: Robust control, H-infinity methods in control theory
- Awards: Fellow, IEEE and IFAC, NSF Presidential Young Investigator Award, IEEE Baker Prize and Axelby Award, IIT Bombay Distinguished Alumnus, Claude E. Shannon Chair, University of Michigan
- Scientific career
- Fields: Control theory
- Workplaces: University of California, Irvine

Pramod P. Khargonekar is an Indian electrical engineer. He is the Vice Chancellor for Research and Distinguished Professor of Electrical Engineering and Computer Science at the University of California, Irvine. An expert in control systems engineering, Dr. Khargonekar has served in a variety of administrative roles in academia and federal funding agencies. Most recently, he served as assistant director for Engineering at the National Science Foundation (2013–2016), and as deputy director for Technology at the Advanced Research Projects Agency – Energy (ARPA–E, 2012–13). From 2001 through 2009, he was the Dean of the College of Engineering at the University of Florida.

== Biography ==
Khargonekar earned his bachelor's degree at the Indian Institutes of Technology, Bombay, in electrical engineering in 1977. In the late 1970s, he moved to Gainesville, Florida, where he studied under the guidance of Rudolf Kálmán. At the University of Florida, Dr. Khargonekar received a master's degree in mathematics in 1980, and a doctorate in electrical engineering in 1981. In 1981, he joined the University of Florida faculty as an assistant professor of electrical engineering.

In 1984, Khargonekar moved to the University of Minnesota as an associate professor, and then was appointed full Professor in 1988. In 1989, he joined the University of Michigan faculty, where, in 1997, he was appointed Chair of the Department of Electrical Engineering and Computer Science, and in 2000 became the Claude E. Shannon Professor of Engineering Science.

In 2001, Khargonekar returned to his alma mater (University of Florida) to become Dean of the College of Engineering and Eckis Professor of Electrical and Computer Engineering. During his tenure as Dean (2001–2009), the number of Ph.D.s awarded (189 during his final year) enjoyed a nearly 100 percent increase. As Dean, he also developed an ambitious strategic plan to elevate the ranking of the College of Engineering, and succeeded in moving it up to 25 (15 among public universities) from 35 (20 among public universities). In collaboration with the college's faculty, in 2002 he also created a Biomedical Engineering Department, which in 2009 moved into the new interdisciplinary Biomedical Sciences Building, which he collaborated with the UF College of Medicine to create. Among his other accomplishments during his tenure as Dean, total research expenditures at the College of Engineering grew from about $65 million to more than $109 million.

== Research ==
Khargonekar's research interests focus on systems and control theory and its applications. Control systems are ubiquitous in modern technological society. Airplanes, automobiles, manufacturing tools and plants, chemical process plants, electric power grid, robots, biomedical devices, and heating and ventilation systems, among others, all contain control systems that ensure their suitable and desired operation. For example, flight control systems ensure airplane behavior during takeoff, cruise, and landing operations. Control theory is concerned with principles, techniques, and tools for analyzing and designing control systems. Often, these analysis and design procedures employ mathematical models of the system to be controlled based on relevant principles and laws from natural sciences. However, due to simplifying approximations and lack of complete knowledge, such mathematical models include errors and inaccuracies. Errors also arise due to inherent variability in manufacturing processes. Robust control is a subfield of control theory that addresses analysis and design processes and tools that can systematically and explicitly deal with modeling errors.

Much of Khargonekar's early work was on new methods drawn from advanced algebra for analysis of system mathematical models. Later, he focused on the field of robust control, where he contributed to the development of state space H-infinity control theory, a major achievement in the field of control. He has also contributed to digital control, system identification, and digital signal processing. He has made pioneering contributions to the application of modern control methods to semiconductor chip manufacturing processes, particularly to plasma processes for etching silicon and other materials. Other applications include color xerography and control of reconfigurable manufacturing systems. In recent years, he has focused on the problem of integrating wind and solar electricity into the power grid. The challenge here is to deal with the inherent variability, unpredictability and uncontrollability of these electric energy sources. He is a contributor to three patents, two of which create methods of optimizing tone reproduction curves, an image rendering technique which has relevance to printing technologies. Colleagues at Xerox indicate that these patents are being used in current Xerox Corp. products.

== Teaching ==
Khargonekar has had a career-long interest in elevating the educational experience for undergraduate and graduate students and promoting education and scientific careers among women and underrepresented students and faculty. During his tenure as Dean, the University of Florida College of Engineering ranked in the top 10 nationally in the number of Ph.D.s graduated and in the top 15 in the number of Ph.D.s per faculty member per year. Also at the University of Florida, he worked with faculty across several departments to revise the undergraduate curriculum through a program designed to help students get a fast start on their undergraduate classes and to create a minority student mentoring program, both designed to increase students' success while boosting the quality of their educational preparation. Similarly, in his role as assistant director in the NSF Engineering Directorate, he promoted efforts to address science, technology, engineering, and mathematics (STEM) issues at all educational levels, with an emphasis on improving opportunities and outcomes for women and underrepresented minorities in engineering.

== Honors ==
Khargonekar has received numerous honors and awards. He is among the ISI Highly Cited Researchers, and has a Google Scholar h-index of 60 and g-index of 130, with one paper, "State-space solutions to standard H/sub 2/and H/sub infinity/control problems", cited 6,895 times. In 1993 he was elected a Fellow of the Institute of Electrical and Electronics Engineers (IEEE). Other honors include an NSF Presidential Young Investigator Award (1985), the IEEE W.R.G. Baker Prize Paper Award (1991), the George Axelby Best Paper Award (from the IEEE Control Systems Society, 1990), the Hugo Schuck Best Paper Award (American Automatic Control Council, 1993), two Japan Society for Promotion of Science Fellowships (1992, 2007), and a Distinguished Alumnus Award from the Indian Institute of Technology, Bombay (1997). At the University of Michigan, he received a teaching excellence award from the EECS department (1992), a research excellence award from the College of Engineering (1994), and the Arthur F. Thurnau Professorship (1995). At the University of Minnesota, he received the George Taylor Distinguished Research Award from the Institute of Technology (1987).

In 2018, Khargonekar was given the IEEE Control Systems Award and in 2018 he was elected as American Association for the Advancement of Science fellow.

== Service ==
Khargonekar has served as associate editor for six publications: IEEE Transactions on Automatic Control; SIAM Journal on Control and Optimization; Mathematics of Control, Signals, and Systems; Systems and Control Letters; International Journal of Robust and Nonlinear Control; and Mathematical Problems in Engineering.
