= Huei Peng =

Taiwanese control researcher

- 彭晖
- Born: 1962
- Died: 22 November 2022 (aged 60). Taipei, Taiwan
- Education: University of California at Berkeley (Ph.D.) Pennsylvania State University(M.S.) National Taiwan University (B.S.)
- Known for: Application of Control Theory to Automotive Engineering, Mcity ABC test.
- Awards: Rufus Oldenburger Medal (2019), Yasundo Takahashi Education Award (2019), Nyquist Lecturer (2018)
- Scientific career
- Fields: Automotive Engineering, Control Engineering
- Workplaces: University of Michigan
- Doctoral advisor: Masayoshi Tomizuka

Huei Peng
- Traditional Chinese: 彭暉
- Simplified Chinese: 彭晖
Transcriptions
Standard Mandarin
- Hanyu Pinyin: Péng Huī
Southern Min
- Hokkien POJ: Phêng Hui

Huei Peng (1962 – 2022) was the Roger L. McCarthy Professor of Mechanical Engineering at the University of Michigan. He made contributions in adaptive control and optimal control, with emphasis on their applications to vehicular and transportation systems, design and control of electrified vehicles, hybrid vehicle drivetrains, and connected and autonomous vehicles. In recognition of his achievements, he was made a fellow of Society of Automotive Engineers (SAE) and the American Society of Mechanical Engineers (ASME). His specific contributions to the application of control theories to ground vehicles includes:

- Preview control theory for intelligent vehicle and highway systems (IVHS)—achieved lateral tracking accuracy with a standard deviation of 0.5 inch.
- Optimal control of hybrid electric vehicles—implemented on a prototype truck for Eaton, the technology has become the basis of commercial hybrid buses with more than 1,000 units sold
- The development of a design process for exhaustive configuration, sizing and control of power split hybrid powertrains. One outcome is the world's first power-split all-wheel-drive powertrain (patent pending).
- The development of an enhanced version of the widely used MacAdam human driver model
- Leading the design and development of Mcity, the world's first purpose-built test facility for connected and automated vehicles.

== Education ==
Peng received a Ph.D. degree from University of California at Berkeley (1992), a M.S. degree from Pennsylvania State University (1988), and a bachelor's degree from National Taiwan University (1984) all in mechanical engineering.

== Academic contributions ==
Peng has more than 300 technical publications, including 167 in referred journals and transactions, 181 conferences publication. He is the coauthor of four patents, three graduate-level textbooks and coeditor of an ASME proceeding. His h-index is 90, based on a Google Scholar analysis accessed on Nov. 2022, with the total number of citations to his work more than 30,000. According to the 1st edition of Research.com ranking, he is among the 25 Top Mechanical and Aerospace Engineering Scientists in the United States. In the 2nd edition, he remains in the top 40.

== Industrial impact ==
Peng is among the winners of the Autos2050 Inaugural Innovation Awards in 2018 from Alliance Automotive Innovation. His award citation reads "for working with industry, government, and academia to improve transportation safety at the Mcity Test Facility in Ann Arbor, MI. Mcity is the first proving ground built for testing connected and automated vehicles and technologies in simulated urban and suburban driving environments. To date (as of Jan 10th 2018), Mcity has invested about $20 million in 40 research projects. Sixteen automakers and auto suppliers are partners in Mcity."

Peng's contributions and expertise in the areas of future mobility and electrification were recognized through his appointment to the Michigan Council on Future Mobility and Electrification (Oct. 2020 - Oct. 2021) by Governor Gretchen Whitmer, "to represent business, policy, research, and technological leader in the future of mobility for the council". "Today's announcement builds on progress we've made this year to cement our status as a hub for innovation and opportunity in the mobility sector", said Governor Gretchen Whitmer regarding the appointment.

== Contributions to the automotive and control community ==
From December 2015 to December 2021, Peng served as the director of Mcity, which studies connected and autonomous vehicle technologies and promotes their deployment. He also served as the director of the US-China Clean Energy Research Center, Clean Vehicle Consortium (2011–2016), executive director of Michigan Interdisciplinary and Professional Engineering (2007–2011), and director of UM's Automotive Engineering Program (2002–2007). Other contributions include chair, ASME Dynamic System and Control Division, 2012–2013; international board member, International Symposium on Advanced Vehicle Control (AVEC), 1998–2022; chair, International program committee, Advanced Vehicle Control (AVEC) Conference, Taipei, Taiwan, 2006; chair, Local Arrangement Committee, Advanced Vehicle Control (AVEC) Conference, Ann Arbor, Michigan, 2000;

=== Awards and honors ===
Peng was awarded the Rufus Oldenburger Medal from the American Society of Mechanical Engineers in 2019 and Yasundo Takahashi Education Award from ASME Dynamic Systems and Control Division in 2019. He was the Nyquist Lecture Speaker at ASME Dynamic Systems and Control Conference in 2018. In addition, he has been posthumously awarded the ASME Soichiro Honda Medal in 2023. The list below shows some of the awards and honors he received.

- Rufus Oldenburger Medal, ASME, 2019
- Yasundo Takahashi Education Award, ASME Dynamic Systems and Control Division, 2019
- Nyquist Lecturer, ASME Dynamic Systems and Control Conference, 2018
- Soichiro Honda Medal, ASME, 2023
- Best Paper Award, 14th International Symposium on Advanced Vehicle Control, 2018
- Michael J. Rabins Leadership Award, The American Society of Mechanical Engineers, Dynamic Systems and Control Division, 2016
- Fellow, Society of Automotive Engineers, 2013
- Chang-Jiang Scholar, Tsinghua University, China, 2010
- Best Paper Award, 10th International Symposium on Advanced Vehicle Control, 2010
- Fellow, American Society of Mechanical Engineers, 2008
- Best Paper Award, 7th International Symposium on Advanced Vehicle Control, 2004
