= Uri Shaked =

Israeli academic

- אורי שקד
- Born: 15 June 1943 (age 83); Petah Tikva, Israel
- Education: Hebrew University
- Children: 2
- Awards: Israel Prize
- Scientific career
- Fields: Electrical engineering Control theory
- Workplaces: Tel Aviv University
- Thesis: Synthesis of Multivariable Linear Time Invariant Feedback Control Systems (1974)
- Doctoral advisor: Isaac M. Horowitz

Uri Shaked (Hebrew: אורי שקד; born: 15 June 1943) is an Israeli professor of Electrical Engineering in the Engineering Faculty at Tel Aviv University, specializing in control theory of uncertain systems. In 2017 he was awarded the Israel Prize for engineering research.

== Early life and education ==
Uri Shaked was born in Petah Tikva, Israel. He studied at "Brenner" high school and received his B.Sc in Physics and Mathematics (1963) and M.Sc in Physics (1966) from the Hebrew University. His Ph.D. degree was received in 1974 from the Department of Applied Mathematics at the Weizmann Institute of Science in Rehovot, Israel. Shaked authored the thesis Synthesis of Multivariable Linear Time Invariant Feedback Control Systems, under the supervision of Prof. Isaac M. Horowitz.

== Career ==
Shaked was a visiting scholar at Cambridge, UK in the years 1974-1976, and then joined the Department of Engineering at Tel Aviv University as a lecturer. He became a senior lecturer in 1977. In 1981 he was also an adjunct lecturer at the Electrical Engineering Faculty of the Technion, and in 1982 he became an associate professor at the Engineering faculty of Tel Aviv university. In 1983-1984 he was a visiting associate professor at the Department of Electrical Engineering and Computer Science, University of California, Berkeley.

In 1985, Shaked became the head of the Electrical Engineering - Systems Department at Tel Aviv and founded the Tel Aviv University Special Program for Practical Electronic Engineers. He was the chairman of the program, which enabled practical electronic engineers to become professional engineers, until 1987.

Shaked was promoted to a full professor at Tel Aviv University in 1987, and held the chair of Celia and Marcos Maus Professor of Computer Systems Engineering (1989-2013). In 1989-1990 he was a visiting professor at Yale University, and in the years 1993-1998 he was the dean of the Engineering faculty at Tel Aviv University.

In 1999 Shaked was a visiting professor at the Imperial College of Science and Technology, Dept. of Electrical and Electronic Engineering in London, UK. Shaked was on the board of directors of Tel Aviv University in the years 2005-2009. In 2011 he retired from Tel Aviv as professor emeritus.

In 2017 he was elected as chairman of the Israeli section of the Institute of Electrical and Electronics Engineers (IEEE).

== Work ==
His research interests include linear and non-linear control of uncertain systems; digital control; H-infinity optimization in filtering and control; control and estimation of systems with time delay.

Upon receiving the Israel Prize (2017) for engineering research, his work and its implications were described by the award committee:

Shaked is considered one of the world’s leading scientists in the field of control theory. The methods developed by Shaked are now widely used in all industries, including the Israeli defense industry. He also made a significant contribution to the expansion of scientific-technological education in Israel and was one of the leaders in the process of establishing academic colleges of engineering that contributed to making academic education accessible to a more diverse range of students.

== Membership in professional societies ==
- 1993- Fellow of IEEE, Control Systems Society
- 2011- Fellow of the Institute of Mathematics and its Applications, UK (IMA)

== Publications ==
Prof. Shaked has authored more than 260 scientific publications, including three monographs.

=== Books ===
- E. Gershon, U. Shaked and I. Yaesh, H_infinity Control and Estimation of State-multiplicative Linear Systems (LNCIS 318), LondonSpringer 2005
- E. Gershon and U. Shaked, Advanced Topics in Control and Estimation of State-multiplicative Noisy Systems (LNCIS 439), LondonSpringer 2013
- E. Gershon and U. Shaked, Advances in H_{∞} Control Theory: Switched, Delayed and Biological Systems. (LNCIS 481), LondonSpringer 2019

=== Selected articles ===
- 1976: U. Shaked, “A General Transfer Function Approach to the Steady-State Linear Quadratic Gaussian Stochastic Control Problem”, Int. J. Control 24, pp. 771–800
- 1976: B. Kouvaritakis and U. Shaked, “Asymptotic Behavior of Root-Loci of Multivariable Systems”, Int. J. Control 23, pp. 297–340
- 1992: I. Yaesh and U. Shaked, “Game Theory Approach to Optimal Linear State Estimation and Its Relation to the Minimum H_{∞}-Norm Estimation”, IEEE Trans. Autom. Control, AC-37, pp. 828–831
- 1995: U. Shaked and C. E. de Souza, “Robust Minimum Variance Filtering”, IEEE Trans. on Signal Processing SP-43, pp. 2474–2483
- 1996: Y. Theodor and U. Shaked, “Robust Discrete-Time Minimum Variance Filtering”, IEEE Trans. on Signal Processing SP-44, pp. 181–189
- 1996: N. Berman and U. Shaked, “H_{∞} Nonlinear Filtering”, Int. J. of Robust and Nonlinear Control 6, pp. 281–295
- 2002: E. Fridman and U. Shaked, “A Descriptor System Approach to H_{∞} Control of Linear Time-Delay Systems”, IEEE Trans. on Automat. Contr. AC-47, pp. 253–270
- 2002: E. Fridman and U. Shaked, “An Improved Stabilization Method for Linear Time-Delay Systems”, IEEE Trans. on Automat. Contr. AC-47, pp. 1931–1937
- 2003: E. Fridman and U. Shaked, “Delay Dependent Stability and H_{∞} Control: Constant and Time-Varying Delays”, Int. J. Control 76, 1, pp 48–60
- 2005: V. Suplin and U. Shaked, “Robust H_{∞} Output-Feedback Control of Linear Discrete-Time Systems”, System & Control Letters 54, pp. 799–808
- 2008: E. Gershon and U. Shaked,“H_{∞} Output-Feedback Control of Discrete-Time Systems With State-Multiplicative Noise.” Automatica, vol. 44, pp. 574–579
- 2012: L. I. Allerhand and U. Shaked, “Robust State Dependant Switching of Linear Systems With Dwell Time”, IEEE Trans. Automat. Contr. 58, pp. 994–1001
- 2019: E. Gershon and U. Shaked, “Robust Predictor Based Control of State Multiplicative Noisy Retarded Systems”, Systems and Control Letters, Volume 132

== Personal life ==
Shaked is married to Zippora, a professor at the Weizmann Institute of Science in Rehovot. They have two daughters and 5 grandchildren, and live in Rehovot.
