= Rufus Oldenburger Medal =

The Rufus Oldenburger Medal is an award given by the American Society of Mechanical Engineers recognizing significant contributions and outstanding achievements in the field of automatic control. It was established in 1968 in the honor of Rufus Oldenburger.

== Recipients ==
The medalists are as follows:

- 1968: Rufus Oldenburger
- 1969: Nathaniel B. Nichols
- 1970: John R. Ragazzini
- 1971: Charles Stark Draper
- 1972: Albert J. Williams, Jr.
- 1973: Clesson E. Mason
- 1974: Herbert W. Ziebolz
- 1975: Hendrik Wade Bode and Harry Nyquist
- 1976: Rudolf E. Kálmán
- 1977: Gordon S. Brown and Harold L. Hazen
- 1978: Yasundo Takahashi
- 1979: Henry M. Paynter
- 1980: Arthur E. Bryson, Jr.
- 1981: Shih-Ying Lee
- 1982: Bernard Friedland
- 1983: Jesse Lowen Shearer
- 1984: Herbert H. Richardson
- 1985: Karl Johan Åström
- 1986: Eliahu I. Jury
- 1987: Walter R. Evans
- 1988: Robert H. Cannon, Jr.
- 1989: Jaakov Z. Tsypkin
- 1990: Harold Chestnut
- 1991: John G. Truxal
- 1992: Isaac M. Horowitz
- 1993: Lotfi A. Zadeh
- 1994: Howard H. Rosenbrock
- 1995: George Leitmann
- 1996: George D. Zames
- 1997: Thomas B. Sheridan
- 1998: David G. Luenberger
- 1999: Yu-Chi Ho
- 2000: Ioan Doré Landau
- 2002: Masayoshi Tomizuka
- 2003: Vadim Utkin
- 2004: Alistair MacFarlane
- 2005: Roger W. Brockett
- 2006: J. Karl Hedrick
- 2007: Suguru Arimoto
- 2008: A. Galip Ulsoy
- 2009: Neville J. Hogan
- 2010: Rolf Isermann
- 2011: Haruhiko Harry Asada
- 2012: Mathukumalli Vidyasagar
- 2013: Graham C. Goodwin
- 2014: Robert R. Bitmead
- 2015: Manfred Morari
- 2016: Jean-Jacques Slotine
- 2017: Miroslav Krstić
- 2018: Roberto Horowitz
- 2019: Huei Peng
- 2020: Mark W. Spong
- 2021: Shankar Sastry
- 2022: Wayne J. Book
- 2023: Davor Hrovat
- 2024: Petros A. Ioannou
- 2025: Hassan K. Khalil
- 2026: Naomi Leonard

== See also ==
- List of people in systems and control
- List of engineering awards
- List of mechanical engineering awards
