= Robust control =

Approach to controller design that explicitly deals with uncertainty

A central theme of control theory is feedback regulation — the design of a feedback controller to achieve stability and a level of performance for a given dynamical system. Tolerance to modeling uncertainty is an essential part of any feedback control scheme, that is, the ability to maintain a satisfactory level of performance when the system dynamics deviate from the nominal value used in the design. The ability of a feedback control system to maintain stability and performance under uncertainty is referred to as robustness.

The term robust control refers to the study of feedback regulation that began taking shape in the late 1970s and onwards, where modeling uncertainty is explicitly acknowledged, modeled, and taken into account in control design. Modeling uncertainty is typically quantified, as is performance, and together are sought to be optimized by casting control design as a suitable optimization problem.

The ability of feedback to cope with uncertainty has been the main reason behind the emergence of the field of control, from its inception in antiquity for Ctesibius' mechanisms, onto Watt's centrifugal governor, and Harold Black's negative-feedback amplifier. Robustness was too the main issue in the classical period of the development of control theory by Bode and Nyquist. Yet, the term robust control was not used until the 1980s when modern methods started being developed to optimize for parametric and non-parametric modeling uncertainty.

Parametric uncertainty refers to the case where modeling parameters or external disturbances in feedback regulation are expected to be found within some (typically compact) set of a finite dimensional space. Thence, robust control aims to achieve robust performance and stability in the presence of such bounded modeling errors. Non-parametric uncertainty refers to the case where the magnitude of expected modeling errors and disturbances is quantified via metrics on function spaces where these reside (infinite dimensional). The term robust control became almost synonymous with the term H-infinity control, since it was the techniques in the development of the latter that gave the early impetus for the new methods.

The early methods of Bode, Nyquist, and others were robust (non-robust control would indeed be a contradiction of terms); they were designed to be, and they were aimed at assessing the level of robustness as well. In contrast, state-space methods that were developed in the 1960s and 1970s did not explicitly account for modeling uncertainty, and often lacked satisfactory levels of robustness, prompting critique from the students of the earlier classical era. The start of the theory of robust control grew out of this critique, took shape in the 1980s and 1990s, and is still active today.

A somewhat different angle in addressing control problems forms the core of what is known as adaptive control. The rationale in this is to design regulation that is not only able to tolerate uncertainty but also to adapt by refining the control mechanism. By necessity, adaptive control schemes are nonlinear, in that the values of control parameters vary as a function of the available measurements. Once again, assumptions on the range of value of system parameters is needed in order to develop a systematic design methodology.

== Loop gain and the quality of regulation ==
The idea of high-gain feedback as a means to regulate amplifier transmission gain was already at the heart of Harold Black's 1927 invention that revolutionized long distance communications. Black, Bode, Nyquist and many of the early founders of the field of control, soon realized the potential tradeoffs between performance in feedback regulation and robustness of stability; high loop gain typically suppresses the effect of external disturbances while at the same time it may destabilize the feedback inter-connection of plant and controller. This realization set the stage for the development of the theory of the so-called classical control; it mainly entails frequency response methods to navigate between such tradeoffs.

Chief amongst the insightful discoveries of classical control in the 1940s, explained in Hendrik Bode's timeless Network Analysis and Feedback Amplifier Design, are the so-called Bode gain-phase relationship and a theorem that the integral of the log sensitivity remains positive. These are fundamental conservation laws deeply rooted in analytic function theory. They underscored issues that are present in any attempt to shape the loop gain across frequencies to meet specifications. Specifically, over frequency bands where disturbance rejection is desirable the gain must be high and, in other frequency bands, where modeling uncertainty is dominant the gain must be low; the phase of the loop transfer function on the other hand, that cannot be independently assigned, dictates stability.

The wisdom drawn from the theory of modern robust control, according to Karl Johan Åström, is that the designer needs to pay attention to the gang of four transfer functions, namely, the sensitivity function $S = 1/(1+PC)$, the complementary sensitivity $T = PC/(1 + PC)$, the control action $CS$, and $PS$. These closed-loop transfer functions prescribe the effect of external disturbances applied at the input and output of the plant, to the same, input and output of the plant. A systematic methodology to shape the loop gain across frequencies, as well as the closed loop characteristics of a feedback interconnection of a linear plant and controller, has been the great success of the theory. These four transfer functions become key in the McFarlane-Glover design methodology of H-infinity loop shaping as well as the theory of robustness in the gap metric.

== Criteria for robustness ==
Informally, a controller designed for a particular set of model parameters is said to be robust if it also works well for values of the parameters near the nominal. High-gain feedback is a simple example of a robust control method; with sufficiently high gain, the effect of any parameter variations will be negligible. From the closed-loop transfer function perspective, high open-loop gain leads to substantial disturbance rejection in the face of system parameter uncertainty. Other examples of robust control include sliding mode and terminal sliding mode control.

The major obstacle to achieving high loop gains is the need to maintain system closed-loop stability. Loop shaping which allows stable closed-loop operation can be a technical challenge.

Robust control systems often incorporate advanced topologies which include multiple feedback loops and feed-forward paths. The control laws may be represented by high order transfer functions required to simultaneously accomplish desired disturbance rejection performance with the robust closed-loop operation.

High-gain feedback is the principle that allows simplified models of operational amplifiers and emitter-degenerated bipolar transistors to be used in a variety of different settings. This idea was already well understood by Bode and Black in 1927.

== The modern theory of robust control ==
The theory of robust control system began in the late 1970s and through the 1980s developed a number of techniques for dealing with system uncertainty. The principal aim of the theory has been to establish guarantees for feedback systems to maintain a satisfactory level of performance in the presence of quantitative levels of modeling error for the constituent components of the control feedback loop. Thence, the design of feedback control systems focuses on optimizing performance guarantees and tolerance to modeling errors.

The first control design to achieve maximal tolerance to uncertain values of a parameter in the model was obtained by Allen Tannenbaum. At about the same time George Zames advocated a framework to quantify uncertainty that conveniently meshed with performance specifications, and proved encompassing for a wide range of important control problems. A rapidly developing phase of new insights and results in control theory ensued, advancing the theory of what is now referred to as modern robust control (aka H-infinity control).

One of the most versatile examples of a robust control technique is H-infinity loop-shaping. It was developed by Duncan McFarlane and Keith Glover of Cambridge University; this method minimizes the sensitivity of a system over its frequency spectrum, and this guarantees that the system will not greatly deviate from expected trajectories when disturbances enter the system. A closely related theory for robust control design, based on the gap metric, was developed by Tryphon T. Georgiou and Malcolm C. Smith, and the v-gap, by Glenn Vinnicombe.

An emerging area of robust control from application point of view is sliding mode control (SMC), which is a variation of variable structure control (VSC). The robustness properties of SMC with respect to matched uncertainty as well as the simplicity in design attracted a variety of applications.

While robust control has been traditionally dealt with along deterministic approaches, in the last two decades this approach has been criticized on the basis that it is too rigid to describe real uncertainty, while it often also leads to over conservative solutions. Probabilistic robust control has been introduced as an alternative, see e.g. that interprets robust control within the so-called scenario optimization theory.

Another example is loop transfer recovery (LQG/LTR), which was developed to overcome the robustness problems of linear-quadratic-Gaussian control (LQG) control.

Other robust techniques includes quantitative feedback theory (QFT), passivity based control, Lyapunov-based control, etc.

When system behavior varies considerably in normal operation, multiple control laws may have to be devised. Each distinct control law addresses a specific system behavior mode. An example is a computer hard disk drive. Separate robust control system modes are designed in order to address the rapid magnetic head traversal operation, known as the seek, a transitional settle operation as the magnetic head approaches its destination, and a track following mode during which the disk drive performs its data access operation.

One of the challenges is to design a control system that addresses these diverse system operating modes and enables smooth transition from one mode to the next as quickly as possible.

Such state machine-driven composite control system is an extension of the gain scheduling idea where the entire control strategy changes based upon changes in system behavior.

== See also ==
- Control theory
- Control engineering
- Fractional-order control
- H-infinity control
- H-infinity loop-shaping
- Gap metric
- Sliding mode control
- Robust integral of the sign of the error controller (RISE)
- Intelligent control
- Process control
- Robust decision making
- Root locus
- Servomechanism
- Stable polynomial
- State space (controls)
- System identification
- Stability radius
- Iso-damping
- Active disturbance rejection control
- Quantitative feedback theory
