= Institute for Intelligent Systems and Robotics =

Research institute in Paris, France

Coordinates: 48°50′45″N 2°21′24″E

Institute of Intelligent Systems and Robotics
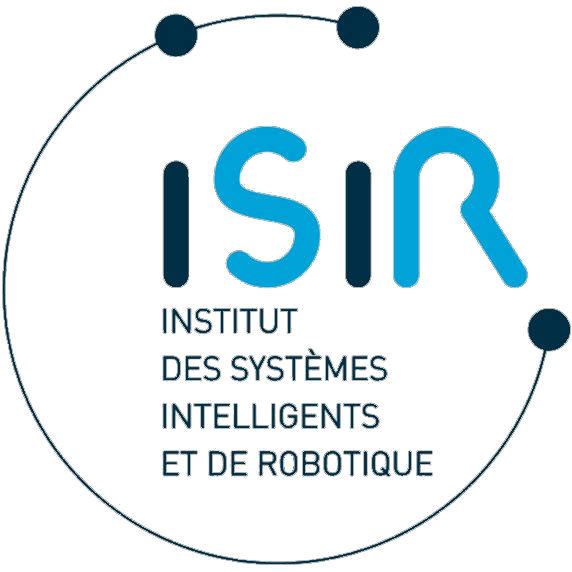
- Logo ISIR
- Type: Nonprofit
- Industry: Research and development Engineering; Science; Robotics mechanics Control engineering Signal processing Computer science Artificial Intelligence (AI)
- Founded: 2007
- Headquarters: Paris, France
- Key people: Stéphane Doncieux (director since 2024)
- Parent: Sorbonne University
- Divisions: ACIDE; ASIMOV; MLIA; IRIS; RPI-BIO
- Website: www.isir.upmc.fr?lang=en (in English)

The Institute of Intelligent Systems and Robotics (French : "Institut des Systèmes Intelligents et de Robotique", ISIR) is a multidisciplinary research laboratory, headquartered in Paris, France, that brings together researchers and teacher-researchers from the fields of mechanics, control engineering, signal processing, and computer science.

ISIR is a joint research unit (UMR7222) affiliated with Sorbonne University, French National Centre for Scientific Research, and French National Institute of Health and Medical Research, primarily through the Institute of Engineering and Systems Sciences (INSIS), and secondarily through the Institute of Computer Science and their Interactions (INS2I) as well as the Institute of Biological Sciences (INSB).

The research conducted at ISIR spans numerous application domains (production robotics, exploration robotics, military robotics, etc.). However, it is particularly focused on emerging applications of robotics and intelligent systems in the life sciences, aiming to establish synergies between engineering, information sciences, and advancements in the cognitive and interactive capabilities of robots.

== Partners ==
Their partners are SoftBank Robotics, Haption, Robeaute, SpineGuard, Geolli, EndoControl, GE HealthCare, Percipio Robotics, and Koelis.

== Startups ==
Researchers of the institute founded startups such as Actronika, Gema, HawAI tech, Basecamp Vascular, and Moon Surgical.
