= Gap metric =

Distance between linear operators

The gap metric is a mathematical concept used to quantify the distance between linear operators on a Hilbert space. It was introduced independently by Mark Krein and Mark Krasnoselsky (1947), and Béla Szőkefalvi-Nagy (1946), in their work on invertibility of differential operators. The gap metric has since found applications in perturbation theory, robust control, and feedback system analysis.

== Definition ==
Let H_{1} and H_{2} be Hilbert spaces, and let P: D_{p} ⊆ H_{1} → H_{2} be a (possibly unbounded) linear operator with domain D_{p}. The graph of P is defined as:

$$G_P := \{(u, y) \mid u \in D_P, y = Pu\} \subseteq H_1 \oplus H_2$$

Let $\Pi_{G_P}$ denote the orthogonal projection from $H_1 \oplus H_2$ onto the graph of P. Then, for two operators P_{1} and P_{2}, the gap metric is defined as:

$$d(P_1, P_2) := \|\Pi_{G_{P_1}} - \Pi_{G_{P_2}}\|$$

This metric takes values in [0, 1] and quantifies the angular separation between the graphs of the two operators.

When the operators are scalar multiplications on $\mathbb{R}$, their graphs correspond to lines in $\mathbb{R}^2$, and the gap equals the sine of the angle between them. The concept applies to subspaces in finite- and infinite-dimensional Hilbert spaces and serves as a measure of proximity between dynamical systems or operators.

== Applications in operator theory ==
The gap metric is central in the perturbation theory of linear operators. Foundational work on this topic is presented in the classical treatise by Tosio Kato on the Perturbation Theory for Linear Operators (1966). Extensions to broader contexts include generalizations to normed vector spaces and manifolds.

== Feedback control applications ==
The gap metric gained prominence in control theory through the work of George Zames and Ahmed El-Sakkary (1979), and the subsequent work by Tryphon T. Georgiou (1988), who showed that the gap metric between linear dynamical systems can be computed via $H^\infty$-optimization. The metric is used to quantify how much a plant (a system that is part of a control feedback loop) can deviate from a nominal model while input-output stability of the feedback loop is maintained.

A useful alternative expression for the gap metric is:

$$d(P_1, P_2) = \max\{\overrightarrow{d}(P_1, P_2), \overrightarrow{d}(P_2, P_1)\}$$

where the directed gap is defined as:

$$\overrightarrow{d}(P_1, P_2) = \|(I - \Pi_{G_{P_2}})\Pi_{G_{P_1}}\| = \inf_{g_2 \in G_{P_2}} \sup \{\|g_1 - g_2\| \mid g_1 \in G_{P_1}, \|g_1\| = 1\}$$

The right hand side gives a time-domain interpretation of the metric as the solution to a min-max approximation problem that is structurally similar that of the Hausdorff distance.

Georgiou showed that the gap metric can be computed as the solution to the following $H_\infty$-optimization problem:

$\overrightarrow{d}(P_1, P_2) = \inf_{\hat{Q} \in H^\infty} \left\| \hat{G}_{P_1} - \hat{G}_{P_2} \hat{Q} \right\|_\infty$

where
$$\hat{G}_P = \begin{bmatrix} \hat{M}_P \\ \hat{N}_P \end{bmatrix}$$
is an inner matrix-valued function in the Hardy space $H^\infty$ and describes the graph of the dynamical system that is viewed as an operator on $L_2[0,\infty)$. This graph symbol corresponds to a coprime factorization of the system transfer function:

$$\hat{P}(s) = \hat{N}(s)\hat{M}(s)^{-1}$$

subject to the normalization condition:

$\hat{M}(i\omega)^* \hat{M}(i\omega) + \hat{N}(i\omega)^* \hat{N}(i\omega) = I$ for $\omega \in \mathbb{R}$.

Normalized coprime factorizations form the basis of the H-infinity loop-shaping method developed by Keith Glover and Duncan McFarlane (1990, 1992), which aligns with the geometric robustness approach of T.T. Georgiou and Malcolm C. Smith (1990), Buddie et al. (1993).

== Robust stability and the graph topology ==
The gap metric induces the graph topology, the weakest topology for which closed-loop stability is a robust property, studied by Mathukumalli Vidyasagar et al. (1982). That is, if a feedback system is stable, then any sufficiently small perturbation (in gap metric) of the plant still results in a stable feedback system.

A key result obtained by Georgiou and Smith (1990) is that for a possibly infinite dimensional linear time-invariant system with matrix transfer function $\hat{P}(s)$ in feedback with a controller having transfer function $C(s)$, stability of the feedback loop is preserved for all perturbations $\hat{P}_{\text{perturbed}}(s)$ satisfying:

$$d(P, P_{\text{perturbed}}) < b_{P,C}$$

where the bound is given by:

$$b_{P,C} = \left\| \begin{bmatrix} I \\ P(s) \end{bmatrix} (I - C(s)P(s))^{-1} [I, -C(s)] \right\|_\infty^{-1}$$

The operator:

$$\Pi_{G_P // G_C} := \begin{bmatrix} I \\ P(s) \end{bmatrix} (I - C(s)P(s))^{-1} [I, -C(s)]$$

has a geometric significance as being the parallel projection onto the graph of P along the graph of C. This concept was extended to nonlinear systems and formed the basis for a robust feedback theory for nonlinear systems developed by Georgiou and Smith.

== Finite-dimensional case ==
In $\mathbb{R}^n$, for two subspaces G_{1} and G_{2} of equal dimension m, represented by orthonormal basis matrices, the gap is:

$$\| (I - G_1 G_1^\top) G_2 \|$$

If the subspaces have different dimensions, the gap metric equals 1. In this case, one of the directed gaps attains the maximum value.

== Related metrics ==
- Graph metric (Vidyasagar, 1982): Introduced to establish metrizability of the graph topology, though it lacks a known computational method.
- ν-gap metric (Vinnicombe (1992)): A frequency-domain analog designed for comparing linear time-invariant systems.

== See also ==
- Control theory
- Operator theory
- Perturbation theory
- H-infinity_methods_in_control_theory
- H-infinity_loop-shaping
- Robust_control
