= Sensitivity (control systems) =

Measure of how a closed loop transfer function is affected by parameter changes

In control engineering, the sensitivity (or more precisely, the sensitivity function) of a control system measures how variations in the plant parameters affect the closed-loop transfer function. Since the controller parameters are typically matched to the process characteristics and the process may change, it is important that the controller parameters are chosen in such a way that the closed loop system is not sensitive to variations in process dynamics. Moreover, the sensitivity function is also important to analyse how disturbances affects the system.

== Sensitivity function ==
A basic closed loop control system, using unity negative feedback. C(s) and G(s) denote compensator and plant transfer functions, respectively.

Let $G(s)$ and $C(s)$ denote the plant and controller's transfer function in a basic closed loop control system written in the Laplace domain using unity negative feedback.

=== Sensitivity function as a measure of robustness to parameter variation ===
The closed-loop transfer function is given by

$T(s) = \frac{G(s)C(s)}{1 + G(s)C(s)}.$

Differentiating $T$ with respect to $G$ yields

$\frac{dT}{dG} = \frac{d}{dG}\left[\frac{GC}{1 + GC}\right] = \frac{C}{(1+C G)^2} = S\frac{T}{G},$

where $S$ is defined as the function

$S(s) = \frac{1}{1 + G(s)C(s)}$

and is known as the sensitivity function. Lower values of $|S|$ implies that relative errors in the plant parameters has less effects in the relative error of the closed-loop transfer function.

=== Sensitivity function as a measure of disturbance attenuation ===
Block diagram of a control system with disturbance

The sensitivity function also describes the transfer function from external disturbance to process output. In fact, assuming an additive disturbance n after the output

of the plant, the transfer functions of the closed loop system are given by

$Y(s) = \frac{C(s)G(s)}{1+C(s)G(s)} R(s) + \frac{1}{1+C(s)G(s)} N(s).$

Hence, lower values of $|S|$ suggest further attenuation of the external disturbance. The sensitivity function tells us how the disturbances are influenced by feedback. Disturbances with frequencies such that $|S(j \omega)|$ is less than one are reduced and disturbances with frequencies such that $|S(j \omega)|$ is larger than one are amplified by the feedback.

== Sensitivity peak and sensitivity circle ==
=== Sensitivity peak ===
It is important that the largest value of the sensitivity function be limited for a control system. The nominal sensitivity peak $M_s$ is defined as

$M_s = \max_{0 \leq \omega < \infty} \left| S(j \omega) \right| = \max_{0 \leq \omega < \infty} \left| \frac{1}{1 + G(j \omega)C(j \omega)} \right|$

and it is common to require that the maximum value of the sensitivity function, $M_s$, be in a range of 1.3 to 2.

=== Sensitivity circle ===
The quantity $M_s$ is the inverse of the shortest distance from the Nyquist curve of the loop transfer function to the critical point $-1$. A sensitivity $M_s$ guarantees that the distance from the critical point to the Nyquist curve is always greater than $\frac{1}{M_s}$ and the Nyquist curve of the loop transfer function is always outside a circle around the critical point $-1+0j$ with the radius $\frac{1}{M_s}$, known as the sensitivity circle. $M_s$ defines the maximum value of the sensitivity function and the inverse of $M_s$ gives you the shortest distance from the open-loop transfer function $L(j\omega)$ to the critical point $-1+0j$.

== See also ==
- Robust control
- PID controller
- Bode's sensitivity integral
