= David Mayne =

British electronic engineer (1930–2024)

Professor David Mayne FRS FREng FIEEE
- Born: David Quinn Mayne; 23 April 1930; Germiston, Gauteng South Africa
- Died: 27 May 2024 (aged 94); Oxford, England
- Education: Witwatersrand University, Imperial College London
- Scientific career
- Fields: Control theory Electrical engineering Mathematical optimization
- Workplaces: Imperial College London, Harvard University, University of California, Davis
- Doctoral advisor: John Westcott
- Doctoral students: Peter E. Caines

David Quinn Mayne FRS (23 April 1930 – 27 May 2024) was a South African-born British academic, engineer, teacher and author. His pioneering and lasting contribution is in the field of control systems engineering. His research interests centred on optimization and optimization-based design, nonlinear control, control of constrained systems, model predictive control and adaptive control.

== Career ==
Having obtained his BSc.(Eng) at the University of the Witwatersrand David Mayne began his career in 1950 as a lecturer there (1950–54; 1957–59). In 1954 he took up a two year post working as an electrical engineer at the British Thomson-Houston Company, Rugby, England. At the end of 1956 he returned to his academic post at the University of Witwatersrand to develop a new course in automatic control and gaining a MSc.(Eng). He next applied for a research position at Imperial College London. Impressed by his MSc thesis, Arnold Tustin and John Westcott, appointed him as lecturer.

He lectured at Imperial College London from 1959-67 and in 1967 obtained his DSc (Eng) and PhD at the University of London under John Westcott. He was a Research Fellow at Harvard (1971). At Imperial College he was Professor of Control theory (1971–91) as well as concurrently heading the Department of Electrical Engineering (1984–88).

He was subsequently a professor in the Dept. of Electrical and Computer Engineering at University of California, Davis from 1989-96. In 1996 he became Professor Emeritus and Senior Research Investigator in the Control and Power Research Group of the Department of Electrical and Electronic Engineering at Imperial College London. He was named honorary professor at Beihang University in Beijing in 2006. His students included Peter Caines.

== Contribution to science ==
Mayne's research work is regarded as not only having had a lasting impact on the development of control theory, but his leadership style has inspired generations of new researchers.

Among his many breakthroughs, was his development of a mathematical method for analysing Model predictive control algorithms (MPC). It is currently used in tens of thousands of applications and is a core part of the advanced control technology by hundreds of process control producers. MPC's strength is its capacity to deal with nonlinearities and hard constraints in a simple and intuitive fashion. His work underpins a class of algorithms that are correct, explainable, and yield control system designs which meet important objectives.

Parisini and Astolfi consider that, "Mayne is also responsible for developing the first two-filter solution to the smoothing problem. This opened the door to substantial developments and is recognised as a pivotal contribution and precursor of the so-called particle filtering. Another cutting-edge contribution was his work on optimization-based design. He was an early user of exact penalty functions for optimization using sequential quadratic programming. The exact penalty method overcomes the widely referenced Maratos effect, identified by one of Mayne’s Ph.D. students. He also contributed to the early development of algorithms for non-differentiable and semi-infinite optimization problems".

== Personal life and death ==
David Quinn Mayne was born in Germiston, South Africa. He completed his education up to Master's level at the University of the Witwatersrand. Early in his career he married fellow South African, Josephine. They had three daughters. The family moved to the UK in the 1950s where Mayne continued his research.

Mayne died in Oxford on 27 May 2024, at the age of 94.

== Awards and affiliations ==
- Giorgio Quazza Medal, 2014
- IEEE Control Systems Award, 2009
- Fellow, International Federation of Automatic Control, 2006
- Honorary Fellow Imperial College London, 2000
- Hon. DTech Lund University Sweden, 1995
- Fellow of the Royal Academy of Engineering 1987
- Sir Harold Hartley Medal 1986
- Royal Society Fellow 1985
- Institute of Electrical and Electronics Engineers FIEEE, Fellow 1981
- Foreign Member of Academia Nacional de Ingeniera, Mexico 1981
- Institution of Engineering and Technology, Fellow 1980
- Institution of Engineering and Technology IET Heaviside Premium (1979 & 1984)
- Engineering and Physical Sciences Research Council EPSRC Senior Research Fellow (1979-1980)

== Selected publications ==
- Differential Dynamic Programming ISBN 9780444000705 (1970)
- D. Q. Mayne and R. W. Brockett (editors), Geometric Methods in System Theory, D. Reidel Publishing Co., (1973).
- Mayne, David Quinn (2015). "John Hugh Westcott 3 November 1920 — 10 October 2014". Biographical Memoirs of Fellows of the Royal Society. 61. Royal Society publishing: 541–554. doi:10.1098/rsbm.2015.0017. ISSN 0080-4606.
- Rawlings, James B.; Mayne, David Q.; and Diehl, Moritz M.; Model Predictive Control: Theory, Computation, and Design (2nd Ed.), Nob Hill Publishing, LLC, ISBN 978-0975937730 (Oct. 2017)

=== Papers ===
- D. Q. Mayne, Optimal Non-Stationary Filters, Chapter 7 in An Exposition of Adaptive Control, Pergamon Press, 1962.
- D. Q. Mayne, Optimal Non-Stationary Estimation of the Parameters of a Linear System with Gaussian Inputs, Journal of Electronics and Control, 14(1): 101--112, 1963.
- D. Q. Mayne, Parameter Estimation, Automatica, 3(3/4):245--256, 1966.
- D. Q. Mayne, A Gradient Method for Determining Optimal Control of Nonlinear Stochastic Systems, Proceedings of IFAC Symposium, Theory of Self-Adaptive Control Systems, editor P. H. Hammond, Plenum Press, 19--27, 1965.
- D. Q. Mayne, A Solution of the Smoothing Problem for Linear Dynamic Systems", Automatica, 4:73--92, 1966.
- D. Q. Mayne, A Second-Order Gradient Method for Determining Optimal Trajectories of Nonlinear Discrete-Time Systems, International Journal of Control, 3:85--95, 1966.
- G. F. Bryant and D. Q. Mayne, A Minimum Principle for a Class of Discrete-Time Stochastic Systems, IEEE Transactions Automatic Control, 14(4):401--403, 1969.
- J. E. Handschin and D. Q. Mayne, Monte Carlo Techniques to Estimate the Conditional Expectation in Multistage Nonlinear Filtering, International Journal of Control, 9(5):547--559, 1966.
- D. Q. Mayne, Differential Dynamic Programming---a Unified Approach to Optimal Control, in Advances in Control Systems, editor C. T. Leondes, Academic Press, 10: 179--254, 1973.
- G. F. Bryant and D. Q. Mayne, The Maximum Principle, International Journal of Control, 20(6):1021--1054, 1974.
- Mayne, David Q.; Michalska, Hannah (1990). "Receding horizon control of nonlinear systems". IEEE Transactions on Automatic Control. 35 (7): 814–824. doi:10.1109/9.57020.
- Mayne, David Q.; Rawlings, James B.; Rao, Christopher V.; Scokaert, Pierre O. M. (2000). "Constrained model predictive control: stability and optimality". Automatica. 36 (6): 789–814. doi:10.1016/S0005-1098(99)00214-9.

=== Papers on optimization and optimal control ===
Mayne and Elijah (Lucien) Polak published together at least 33 papers over 20 years of collaboration and friendship, from 1975 to 1994.

- Mayne, D. Q. and Polak, E., First Order, Strong Variations Algorithms for Optimal Control, Journal of Optimization Theory and Applications, 16(3/4):277--301, 1975.
- D. Q. Mayne and E. Polak, Feasible Directions Algorithms for Optimization Problems with Equality and Inequality Constraints, Mathematical Programming, 11(1):67--80, 1976.
- Polak, E. and Mayne, D. Q., An Algorithm for Optimization Problems with Functional Inequality Constraints, IEEE Transactions on Automatic Control, 21(2):184--193, 1976.
- D. Q. Mayne, Sufficient Conditions for a Control to be a Strong Minimum, Journal of Optimization and Applications, 21(3):339--352, 1977.
- D. Q. Mayne, E. Polak and R. Trahan, An Outer Approximations Algorithm for Computer Aided Design Problems, Journal of Optimization and Applications, 28(3):231--352, 1979.
- Mayne, D. Q. and Polak, E., An Exact Penalty Function Algorithm for Control Problems with Control and Terminal Equality Constraints---Part 1, Journal of Optimization and Applications, 32(2):211--246, 1980.
- Mayne, D. Q. and Polak, E., An Exact Penalty Function Algorithm for Control Problems with Control and Terminal Equality Constraints---Part 2, Journal of Optimization and Applications, 32(3):345--363, 1980.
- Polak, E. and Mayne, D. Q., On the Solution of Singular Value Inequalities over a Continuum of Frequencies, IEEE Transactions on Automatic Control, 26(3):690--695, 1981.
- Polak, E. and Mayne, D. Q., Design of Nonlinear Feedback Controllers, IEEE Transactions on Automatic Control, 26(3):730--733, 1981.
- Mayne, D. Q., Polak, E. and Voreadis, A., A Cut Map Algorithm for Design Problems with Tolerances, IEEE Transactions on Circuits and Systems, 29(1):35--46, 1982.
- Mayne, D. Q. and Polak, E., Nondifferentiable Optimization via Adaptive Smoothing, Journal of Optimization and Applications, 43(4):601--613, 1984.
- D. Q. Mayne and E. Polak, A Superlinearly Convergent Algorithm for Constrained Optimization Problems, Mathematical Programming Studies, 16:45--61, 1982.
- Polak, E., Mayne, D. Q. and Stimler, D. M., Control System Design via Semi-Infinite Optimization, Proceedings of the IEEE, 72(12):1777--1795, 1984.
- E. Polak and D. Q. Mayne, Algorithm Models for Non-Differentiable Optimization, SIAM Journal of Control and Optimization, 23:477--491, 1985.
- Pantoja, J. F. A. de O. and D. Q. Mayne, A Sequential Quadratic Programming Algorithm for Discrete Optimal Control Problems with Control Inequality Constraints, International Journal of Control, 53(4):823--836, 1991.
- E. Polak, T. H. Yang and D. Q. Mayne, A Method of Centers Based on Barrier Functions for Solving Optimal Control Problems with Continuum State and Control Constraints, in New Trends in System Theory, editors G. Conte, A. M. Perdon and B. Wyman, Birkhauser, 591--598, 1991.
