= George Zames =

Polish-Canadian scientist and professor (1934 - 1997)

- Born: January 7, 1934; Łódź, Poland
- Died: August 10, 1997 (aged 63); Montreal, Quebec, Canada
- Education: MIT; Imperial College; McGill University
- Known for: H-infinity methods in control theory
- Awards: Killam Prize; IEEE Control Systems Science and Engineering Award; Rufus Oldenburger Medal (1996)
- Scientific career
- Fields: Control theory
- Workplaces: McGill University; NASA; Harvard University; MIT
- Doctoral advisor: Norbert Wiener; Yuk-Wing Lee
- Other academic advisors: Colin Cherry; John Hugh Westcott

George Zames (January 7, 1934 – August 10, 1997) was a Polish-Canadian control theorist and professor at McGill University, Montreal, Quebec, Canada. Zames is known for his fundamental contributions to the theory of robust control, and was credited for the development of various well-known results such as small-gain theorem, passivity theorem, circle criterion in input–output form, and most famously, H-infinity methods.

== Biography ==
=== Childhood ===
George Zames was born on January 7, 1934, in Łódź, Poland to a Jewish family. Growing up in Warsaw, Zames and his family escaped the city at the onset of World War II, and moved to Kobe (Japan), through Lithuania and Siberia, and finally to the Anglo-French International Settlement in Shanghai. Zames indicated later that he and his family owe their lives to the transit visa provided by the Japanese Consul to Lithuania, Chiune Sugihara. In Shanghai, Zames continued his schooling, and in 1948, the family emigrated to Canada.

=== Education ===
Zames entered McGill University at the age of 15 and received a B.Eng. degree in Engineering Physics. Graduating at the top of his class, Zames won an Athlone Fellowship to study in England, and moved to the Imperial College. Graduating in two years, his advisors included Colin Cherry, Dennis Gabor, and John Hugh Westcott. In 1956, Zames entered the Massachusetts Institute of Technology to start his doctoral studies, and in 1960 earned a Sc.D. for a thesis titled Nonlinear Operations of System Analysis. He was advised by Norbert Wiener and Yuk-Wing Lee.

=== Career ===
From 1960 to 1965, Zames held various teaching positions at MIT and Harvard University. In 1965, Zames received a Guggenheim Fellowship and moved to the NASA Electronic Research Center (ERC), where he founded the Office of Control Theory and Applications (OCTA). In 1969, it was announced that NASA ERC was to be closed, and Zames joined the newly established Department of Transportation Research Center in 1970. In 1972, Zames spent a sabbatical at the Technion in Haifa, Israel, and in 1974, he returned to McGill University to become a professor and eventually the MacDonald Chair of Electrical Engineering until his death in 1997.

=== Family ===
Zames was married to Eva, whom he met in Israel. They have two sons, Ethan and Jonathan. The cousin he grew up with in Warsaw, architect Israel Stein, lives in Israel after surviving the Holocaust.

== Research ==
Zames’s research focused on imprecisely modelled systems using the input-output method, an approach that is distinct from the state space representation that dominated control theory for several decades. At the core of much of his work is the objective of complexity reduction through organization:

For the purposes of control design, gross qualitative properties such as robustness can be analyzed and predicted without depending on accurate models or syntheses. Mathematical analysis provides topological tools that are very well suited for this purpose, such as compactness, contraction, and fixed-point methods. Furthermore, in control design, where there is lots of model uncertainty, it is often more important to be able to gauge qualitative behaviour (robustness, stability, existence of oscillations) than to compute exactly.

== Legacy ==
The International Journal of Robust and Nonlinear Control published in 2000 a special issue in George Zames’s honour, including a complete list of his publications. Reviews of Zames’s life and legacy were published by S. Mitter and A. Tannenbaum, J. C. Willems, and in a volume resulting from a conference held to honor the occasion of Zames's 60th birthday.

== Awards and honors ==
- In 1984 the IEEE Control Systems Science and Engineering Award
- In 1995 the Killam Prize
- In 1996 the Rufus Oldenburger Medal from the American Society of Mechanical Engineers
