= John Westcott =

John Westcott may refer to:

- John Westcott (computer scientist) (1920–2014), British scientist specialising in control systems
- John Westcott (footballer) (born 1979), English footballer
- John S. Westcott (1807–1888), American surveyor, physician, politician, and Confederate States Army officer
