= Rolf Isermann =

German professor of control engineering

Rolf Isermann (* 20 August 1938 in Stuttgart) is a German engineer and professor of control engineering in the Department of Electrical Engineering and Information Technology at Technical University of Darmstadt.

== Professional life ==
Rolf Isermann studied mechanical engineering at Stuttgart Technical University and graduated in 1962. In 1965, he obtained his doctorate in engineering from the same university with a dissertation entitled Das regeldynamische Verhalten der Überhitzung bei Berücksichtigung der Koppelungen mit anderen Teilen eines Dampferzeugers (The control dynamic behavior of superheaters including couplings inside the steam generator). In 1968, Isermann qualified as a teaching professor (venia legendi) with a thesis Das regeldynamische Verhalten dampfbeheizter Wärmeübertrager (The control dynamic behavior of steam heated heat exchangers) at the Fakultät für Maschinenbau of University of Stuttgart.

In 1971, Isermann took up a visiting professorship at Purdue University in the US State of Indiana. In 1972, he became a teaching professor and in 1974 a professor of control engineering at the University of Stuttgart. In 1977, Isermann aceppted an appointment as successor to Professor Winfried Oppelt at the Technical University of Darmstadt. From then until his retirement in 2006, he represented the field of control engineering, process automation and mechatronic systems in the Department of Electrical Engineering and Information Technology at TU Darmstadt.

From 1988 to 2001, Isermann was guiding the Collaborative Research Center 241 on Integrated Mechanical Electronic Systems (Mechatronic Systems), funded by the German Research Foundation (DFG). 1998 Isermann was a vsiting professor in the Department of Mechanical Engineering at the University of California at Berkeley. Rolf Isermann retired in 2006, and was still active in research.

== Scientific Contribution ==
Isermann's scientific work is devoted to both the theoretical and practical aspects of control engineering. In theoretical research, the focus is on modeling and controlling the dynamic behavior of technical systems, applying new methods in model identification, digital control, and adaptive control, as well as in fault detection and diagnosis of technical systems. The connection to practical issues is ensured by addressing current control engineering problems relating to areas as actuators, electrical motors, refrigeration processes, motor vehicles, power plants, oil and gas pipelines, pumps, robots, dryers, combustion engines, heat pumps, heat exchangers, rolling mills and machine tools.

During his scientific career, Isermann has supervised 127 doctoral theses – a number that is extremely rare in the engineering sciences. Isermann supervised the first five doctoral theses at the University of Stuttgart. This was followed by a further 122 dissertations at the Technical University of Darmstadt. 70 percent of Isermann's research work is financed by third-party funds, a third of which comes from cooperation agreements with industry. From 1977 to 2006, Isermann's laboratory attracted a total of almost 40 million euros in third-party funding.

== Activities at the International Federation of Automatic Control (IFAC) ==
- 1975–1978: Chairman of the Application Committee
- 1988–1993: Founder and Chairman of the Safeprocess Committee
- 1996–1999: IFAC Vice President and Chair of the Executive Board
- 1997: IFAC World Congress Munich, Chair of the IFAC International Program Committee
- 1999–2002: IFAC Vice President and Chair of the Technical Board
- 2002–2008: Member of the IFAC Council (later IFAC Advisor)

== Honors and awards ==
- 1989 Honorary doctorate Dr. h. c. from the Faculté des Sciences appliquées at Université libre de Bruxelles, Belgium.
- 1996 Ring of Honor from the Association for Electrical, Electronic and Information Technologies (VDE) for his pioneering technical and scientific achievements.
- 1996 Honorary doctorate Dr. h. c. from the Politehnica University of Bucharest.
- 1998 Visiting professor in the Department of Mechanical Engineering at the University of California at Berkeley as part of the Russell Severance Springer Professorship.
- 2003 Selected by the Massachusetts Institute of Technology magazine MIT Technology Review as one of 10 scientists whose research into new technologies (mechatronics) will have a lasting impact.
- 2007 Honorary member of the Association of German Engineers (VDI).
- 2010 Rufus Oldenburger Medal from the American Society of Mechanical Engineers (ASME).
- 2020 Cross of Merit on Ribbon of the Federal Republic of Germany (Federal Cross of Merit/Bundesverdienstkreuz am Bande).

== Publications (books) ==
Modeling and Identification

- Isermann, Rolf (1974). Prozessidentifikation. Identifikation und Parameterschätzung dynamischer Prozesse mit diskreten Signalen. Springer. ISBN 3-540-06911-9.
- Isermann, Rolf (1992). Identifikation dynamischer Systeme: Grundlegende Methoden (2nd ed.). Springer. ISBN 3-540-54924-2.
- Isermann, Rolf (1992). Identifikation dynamischer Systeme: Besondere Methoden, Anwendungen (2nd ed.). Springer. ISBN 3-540-55468-8.
- Isermann, Rolf and Münchhof, Marco (2011). Identification of Dynamic Systems. An Introduction with Applications. Springer. ISBN 978-3-540-78878-2.

Control Engineering

- Isermann, Rolf (1987). Digitale Regelsysteme. Grundlagen, Deterministische Regelungen (2nd ed.). Springer. ISBN 3-540-16596-7.
- Isermann, Rolf (1987). Digitale Regelsysteme. Stochastische Regelungen, Mehrgrößenregelungen, Adaptive Regelungen, Anwendungen (2nd ed.). Springer. ISBN 3-540-16597-5.
- Isermann, R. and Lachmann, K.H. and Matko, D. (1992). Adaptive Control Systems. Prentice Hall. ISBN 0-13-005414-3.

Fault Diagnosis

- Isermann, Rolf (1994). (Editor) Überwachung und Fehlerdiagnose technischer Systeme. Moderne Methoden und ihre Anwendungen bei technischen Systemen. VDI-Buch. ISBN 978-3-540-62178-2.
- Isermann, Rolf (2006). Fault Diagnosis Systems. An Introduction from Fault Detection to Fault Tolerance. Springer. ISBN 978-3-540-24112-6.
- Isermann, Rolf (2011). Fault-Diagnosis Applications: Model-Based Condition Monitoring: Actuators, Drives, Machinery, Plants, Sensors, and Fault-tolerant Systems. Springer. ISBN 978-3-642-12766-3.

Control of Combustion Engines

- Isermann, Rolf (2003). (Editor) Modellgestützte Steuerung, Regelung und Diagnose von Verbrennungsmotoren. Springer. ISBN 3-540-44286-3.
- Isermann, Rolf (2010). (Editor) Elektronisches Management motorischer Fahrzeugantriebe: Elektronik, Modellbildung, Regelung und Diagnose für Verbrennungsmotoren, Getriebe und Elektroantriebe. Vieweg + Teubner. ISBN 978-3-8348-0855-4.
- Isermann, Rolf (2014). Engine Modeling and Control. Springer. ISBN 978-3-642-39933-6.
- Isermann, Rolf (2017). Combustion Engine Diagnosis. Springer-Vieweg. ISBN 978-3-662-49466-0.

Vehicle Dynamics and Control

- Isermann, Rolf (2006). (Editor) Fahrdynamik-Regelung: Modellbildung, Fahrerassistenzsysteme, Mechatronik. Vieweg + Teubner. ISBN 978-3-8348-0109-8.
- Isermann, Rolf (2022). Automotive Control: Modeling and Control of Vehicles. Springer. ISBN 978-3-642-39439-3.

Mechatronic Systems

- Isermann, Rolf (1999). Mechatronische Systeme, Grundlagen. Springer. ISBN 978-3-540-64725-6.
- Isermann, Rolf (2002). Mechatronische Systeme, Grundlagen - Studienausgabe. Springer. ISBN 978-3-540-43129-9.
- Isermann, Rolf (2005). Mechatronic Systems: Fundamentals. Springer. ISBN 978-1-85233-930-2.
- Isermann, Rolf (2008). Mechatronische Systeme, Grundlagen (2nd ed.). Springer. ISBN 978-3-540-32336-5.
