= Bernard Friedland =

American engineer and professor

- Education: Columbia University
- Awards: Rufus Oldenburger Medal (1982)
- Scientific career
- Fields: Control system
- Workplaces: Columbia University; New York University; Technion – Israel Institute of Technology; New Jersey Institute of Technology

Bernard Friedland is an American professor of engineering. He is Distinguished Professor of Electrical and Computer Engineering at the New Jersey Institute of Technology.

== Biography ==
Friedland was born in New York City and graduated from Brooklyn Technical High School. He received his B.A., B.S., M.S., and Ph.D. degrees all from Columbia University. He taught at Columbia University, New York University, Technion – Israel Institute of Technology, and joined the faculty of New Jersey Institute of Technology in 1990. His research has focused on system and control theory and its applications. For 28 years, he was a manager at Kearfott Guidance & Navigation.

Friedland is the recipient of the 1982 Rufus Oldenburger Medal from the American Society of Mechanical Engineers (ASME), citing his "creative extensions to the theory of optimal control and recursive filtering and its practical application to the design of guidance and navigation systems." He is also a fellow of the ASME and the Institute of Electrical and Electronics Engineers.
