= Jesse Lowen Shearer =

American mechanical engineer

Jesse Lowen Shearer (1921—1992) was an American professor, engineer and pioneer in the field of hydraulics.

Shearer obtained his Sc.D. at Massachusetts Institute of Technology (MIT), and as a member of their faculty for mechanical engineering he worked at Dynamic Analysis & Control Laboratory from 1950 to 1963. After then he became professor of the faculty of mechanical engineering at Pennsylvania State University until his retirement 1985. He was also a member of the Dynamic Systems and Control Division of American Society of Mechanical Engineers (ASME).

== Awards and honors ==
1965 he received the Donald P. Eckman Award of the Instrument Society of America, 1966 he got the Charles Russ Richards Memorial Award of the American Society of Mechanical Engineers and finally 1983 the Rufus Oldenburger Medal of ASME.

== Selected publications ==
Shearer wrote many books, papers, and articles on hydraulics and system dynamics such as:

- Introduction to System Dynamics (1967) - wrote with Arthur T. Murphy and Herbert H. Richardson
- Dynamic Modeling and Control of Engineering Systems (2007) - wrote with Bohdan T. Kulakowski and John F. Gardner
