= Bruce Sayers =

British electrical engineer

Bruce Mc Arthur Sayers
- Born: 6 February 1928; Hampstead London
- Died: 12 May 2008 (aged 80); Salisbury
- Education: Imperial College
- Spouse: Ruth Wools Humphery
- Scientific career
- Fields: biomedical engineering
- Workplaces: Melbourne University, Imperial College
- Doctoral advisor: Colin Cherry

Bruce Mc Arthur Sayers (6 February 1928 – 12 May 2008) was a British electrical engineer. He was a professor and served as head of the Department of Electrical Engineering and later head of the Department of Computing at Imperial College, London.

He was also Dean of the City and Guilds College for two terms.

He married Ruth Wools Humphery on 30 August 1951 in the Presbyterian Church Frankston Victoria. By the winter of 1954 Bruce and Ruth had boarded the Italian Ship Flotta Laura bound for the UK.

== Works ==
Source: Sayers was born in Hampstead London on 6 February 1928 and moved to Melbourne with his parents. He was initially educated at the Royal Melbourne Institute of Technology (RMIT). He graduated from Melbourne University with a first-class degree in Physics and Electrical Engineering. He then worked as an electronics design engineer before working in Imperial College as a research student. In 1968 he became Professor of Engineering Applied to Medicine.

During the 1960s Sayers established the Engineering in Medicine Laboratory, which became a research centre for physics and engineering applications to biomedical problems. In 1989, the laboratory eventually became the college's Centre for Biological and Medical Systems. Finally, in the 1990s, this became the Department of Bioengineering for Imperial College.

Throughout his career, Sayers published various research papers about signal processing and statistical techniques to biomedical problems. He worked with the World Health Organization to study the spread of many diseases. In the 1990s he worked in WHO's Advisory Committee on Heath Research (ACHR), chaired several subcommittees, and served as the vice-chairman of ACHR.

Sayers co-edited a book on Global Health and the Encyclopedia of Life Support Systems, which is sponsored by UNESCO, until his death.
