= International Journal of Control =

Scientific journal

- Discipline: Control engineering
- Language: English
- Edited by: Eric Rogers

Publication details
- Former names: Journal of Electronics and Control (1955—1957); Journal of Electronics and Control (1957—1964)
- History: 1955—present
- Publisher: Taylor & Francis
- Frequency: Monthly
- Impact factor: 1.6 (2024)

Standard abbreviations
- ISO 4: Int. J. Control

Indexing
- CODEN: IJELA2
- ISSN: 0020-7179 (print); 1366-5820 (web)

Links
- Journal homepage; Online access; Online archive

International Journal of Control is a peer-reviewed scientific journal published monthly by Taylor & Francis. It covers research on control theory and control engineering. Its current editor-in-chief is Eric Rogers (University of Southampton).

The journal was established in 1955 under the name Journal of Electronics, Retitled to Journal of Electronics and Control in 1957, the journal split into International Journal of Electronics and International Journal of Control in 1964.

== Abstracting and indexing ==
The journal is abstracted and indexed in:

- Current Contents/Engineering, Computing & Technology
- EBSCO databases
- Ei Compendex
- MathSciNet
- ProQuest databases
- Science Citation Index Expanded
- Scopus
- zbMATH Open

According to the Journal Citation Reports, the journal has a 2024 impact factor of 1.6.
