= H-infinity loop-shaping =

H-infinity loop-shaping is a design methodology in modern control theory. It combines the traditional intuition of classical control methods, such as Bode's sensitivity integral, with H-infinity optimization techniques to achieve controllers whose stability and performance properties hold despite bounded differences between the nominal plant assumed in design and the true plant encountered in practice. Essentially, the control system designer describes the desired responsiveness and noise-suppression properties by weighting the plant transfer function in the frequency domain; the resulting 'loop-shape' is then 'robustified' through optimization. Robustification usually has little effect at high and low frequencies, but the response around unity-gain crossover is adjusted to maximise the system's stability margins. H-infinity loop-shaping can be applied to multiple-input multiple-output (MIMO) systems.

H-infinity loop-shaping can be carried out using commercially available software.

H-infinity loop-shaping has been successfully deployed in industry. In 1995, R. Hyde, K. Glover and G. T. Shanks published a paper describing the successful application of the technique to a VTOL aircraft. In 2008, D. J. Auger, S. Crawshaw and S. L. Hall published another paper describing a successful application to a steerable marine radar tracker, noting that the technique had the following benefits:

- Easy to apply – commercial software handles the hard math.
- Easy to implement – standard transfer functions and state-space methods can be used.
- Plug and play – no need for re-tuning on an installation-by-installation basis.

A closely related design methodology, developed at about the same time, was based on the theory of the gap metric. It was applied in 1993 for designing controllers to dampen vibrations in large flexible structures at Wright-Patterson Air Force Base and Jet Propulsion Laboratory.

== See also ==
- Control theory
- H-infinity control
- Gap metric
