= Ioan Doré Landau =

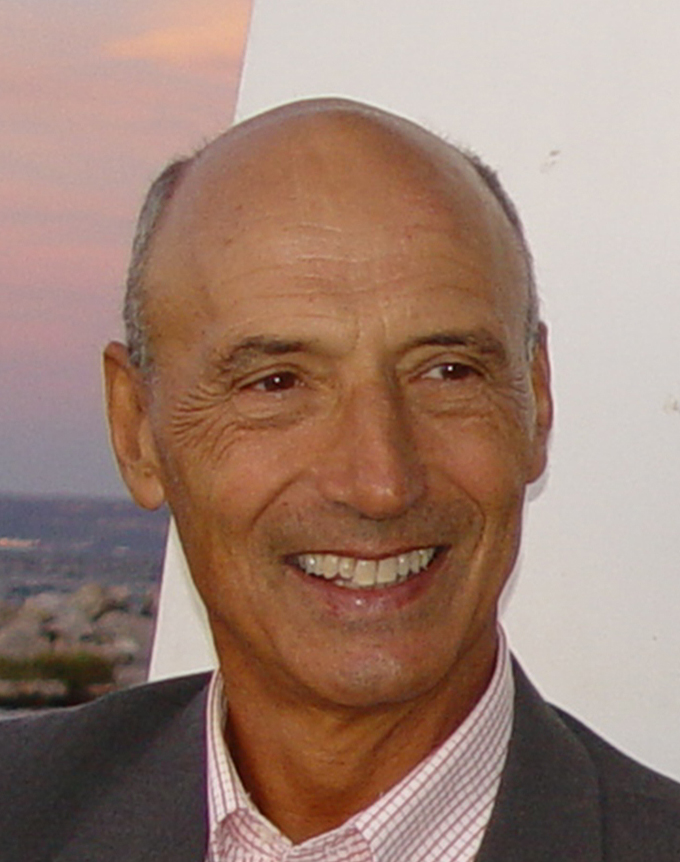
- Ioan Doré Landau in 2011
- Born: July 1, 1938; Bucharest, Romania
- Education: Docteur en génie électrique, Docteur es sciences physiques, Politehnica University of Bucharest, Université Joseph-Fourier de Grenoble
- Known for: Adaptive control, System identification
- Awards: CNRS Silver Medal (1982); Prix Michel-Monpetit (1991); Rufus Oldenburger Medal (2000)
- Scientific career
- Fields: Automatic control
- Institutions: CNRS - Directeur de recherche émérite

Ioan Doré Landau (born July 1, 1938 in Bucharest) is a French scientist specializing in automatic control.

He is an emeritus research director at the CNRS, has published many groundbreaking papers and articles on the theory and applications of system identification, adaptive control, robust digital control, nonlinear systems, and is internationally recognized in these fields.

He is notably the author of numerous algorithms known as "Model Reference Approach" for adaptive control and identification of systems.

== Biography ==
Landau obtained an engineering degree in electronics from the Polytechnic Institute of Bucharest in 1959, training which he completed in 1965 with a doctorate in electrical engineering at the same Institute and, in 1973, with a doctorate in physical sciences from the Joseph-Fourier University of Grenoble.

After having held several jobs in R&D until 1972 (Design Institute for Automation in Bucharest, Institute of Energy of the Romanian Academy (Group of Vasile M. Popov), Alsthom, NASA- Ames Research Center,...), he became an associate professor at the Grenoble Institute of Technology (from 1973 to 1976), then joined the CNRS where he rose, in 1983, to the position of research director.

From 1987 to 1990, he was also the director of the Grenoble Automation Laboratory (LAG).

He is one of the founders and the first president (from 1991 to 1993) of the European Union Control Association (EUCA).

From 1994 to 2002 he was editor-in-chief of the European Journal of Control (EUCA publication).

== Works ==
In 1968, Landau won the Grand Gold Medal at the Vienna Inventions Exhibition (Austria) for his patent on variable frequency control of asynchronous motors. He has since filed other international patents.

As research director at the CNRS, he launched and directed several national research programs on mathematical tools and models for automation, systems analysis and signal processing (1979-1982), adaptive systems in automatic control and signal processing (1984-1988) and automatic control (1988-1996).

During his career, he directed more than 40 doctoral theses, in France and in collaboration with various universities around the world, and participated in numerous international conferences, several of which he chaired. In particular, in 1991, in Grenoble, he chaired the organizing committee of the first European Conference on Automatic Control (European Control Conference - ECC).

In June 1998, the CNRS organized in his honour an international conference entitled "Perspectives in Control - Theory and Applications" .

== Publications ==
Landau is the author or co-author of more than 400 scientific publications in the field of automatic control.

=== Main works ===
- Landau, Ioan Doré (1979). Adaptive Control: The Model Reference Approach. New York: Dekker. p. 432. ISBN 978-0824765484.
- Landau, Ioan Doré; Tomizuka, Masayoshi (1981). Adaptive Control, Theory and Practice. Tokyo: Ohm Shia.
- Landau, Ioan Doré; Tomizuka, Masayoshi; Auslander, David M. (2014). Adaptive Systems in Control and Signal Processing. Elsevier. ISBN 978-1-4831-9065-5.
- System identification and control design using P.I.M plus software (français). Prentice Hall PTR. 1989. ISBN 978-0-13-880782-5.; published also in French and Romanian: Landau, Ioan Doré (1993). Identification et Commandes des Systèmes (in French). Paris: Hermes Science Publications. p. 535. ISBN 978-2-86601-365-3.; Identificarea si comanda sistemelor (in Romanian). Bucarest: Editura Tehnica. 1997. p. 323.
- Landau, Ioan Doré (1998). Identification des systèmes. Série Automatique (in French). Paris: Hermès. ISBN 978-2-86601-683-8..
- Ioan D. Landau; Alina Besançon-Voda (2001). Identification des systèmes. Systèmes automatisés (in French). Paris: Hermès Science Publications. p. 384. ISBN 978-2-7462-0220-7.
- Landau, Ioan Doré (2002). Commande des systèmes. Hermes Science Publications (in French). Paris: Hermès - Lavoisier. ISBN 978-2-7462-0478-2..
- Landau, Ioan Doré; Zito, Gianluca (2006). Digital control systems: design, identification and implementation. Londres: Springer-Verlag.
- Landau, Ioan Doré; Lozano, Rogelio; M'Saad, Mohamed; Karimi, Alireza (2011). Adaptive Control. Londres: Springer. p. 590. ISBN 978-0-85729-664-1.
- Landau, Ioan Doré; Airimitoaie, Tudor-Bogdan; Castellanos-Silva, Abraham; Constantinescu, Aurelian (2017). Adaptive and Robust Active Vibration Control. Springer-Verlag. ISBN 978-3-319-41449-2.

== Awards and recognition ==
- 1968: gold medal at the International Exhibition of Inventions in Vienna (Austria)
- 1981-84: Best Review Paper Award from the American Society of Mechanical Engineers, for his article on adaptive control published in the Journal of Dynamical Systems Measurement and Control
- 1982: CNRS silver medal
- 1991: Michel-Monpetit prize of the Academy of Sciences
- 1992: he is distinguished Russell Severance Springer Professor from the University of California, Department of Mechanical Engineering, Berkeley
- 2000: Rufus Oldenburger Medal of the American Society of Mechanical Engineers
- 2001-2003: "Distinguished lecturer" from the IEEE Control Systems Society
- 2003: doctorat honoris causa from the Faculty of Sciences of the Catholic University of Louvain la Neuve (Belgium)
- 2007: IFAC Fellow
- 2009: Life Achievement Award from the Mediterranean Control Association
- 2014: Certificate of Recognition for Contributions to European Control Conference and European Control Association
- 2014: Robert-Houdin prize
- 2017: honorary doctorate from the Polytechnic University of Bucharest (Romania, 2017)
