= Iso-damping =

Iso-damping is a desirable system property referring to a state where the open-loop phase Bode plot is flat—i.e., the phase derivative with respect to the frequency is zero, at a given frequency called the "tangent frequency", ${\omega}_c$. At the "tangent frequency" the Nyquist curve of the open-loop system tangentially touches the sensitivity circle and the phase Bode is locally flat which implies that the system will be more robust to gain variations. For systems that exhibit iso-damping property, the overshoots of the closed-loop step responses will remain almost constant for different values of the controller gain. This will ensure that the closed-loop system is robust to gain variations.

The iso-damping property can be expressed as $\frac{d \angle G(s)}{ds}{|}_{s = j\omega_c} = 0$, or equivalently:

$$\angle \frac{dG(s)}{ds}{|}_{s = j\omega_c} = \angle G(s){|}_{s = j\omega},$$

where $\omega_c$ is the tangent frequency and $G(s)$ is the open-loop system transfer function.

== Bode's ideal transfer function ==
In the middle of the 20th century, Bode proposed the first idea involving the use of fractional-order controllers in a feedback problem by what is known as Bode's ideal transfer function. Bode proposed that the ideal shape of the Nyquist plot for the open loop frequency response is a straight line in the complex plane, which provides theoretically infinite gain margin. Ideal open-loop transfer function is given by:

$$L(s) = \left(\frac{s}{\omega_{gc}}\right)^\alpha$$

where ${\omega}_{gc}$ is the desired gain cross over frequency and $\alpha < 0$ is the slope of the ideal cut-off characteristic.

The Bode diagrams of $L(s)$, $-2 < \alpha < -1$, are very simple. The amplitude curve is a straight line of constant slope $20\alpha$ dB/dec, and the phase curve is a horizontal line at $\frac{\alpha \pi}{2}$ rad. The Nyquist curve consists of a straight line through the origin with $\arg(L( j\omega)) = \frac{\alpha \pi}{2}$ rad.

The major benefit achieved through this structure is iso-damping, i.e. overshoot being independent of the payload or the system gain. The usage of fractional elements for description of ideal Bode's control loop is one of the most promising applications of fractional calculus in the process control field. Bode's ideal control loop frequency response has the fractional integrator shape and provides the iso-damping property around the gain crossover frequency. This is due to the fact that the phase margin and the maximum overshoot are defined by one parameter only (the fractional power of $s$), and are independent of open-loop gain.

Bode's ideal loop transfer function is probably the first design method that addressed robustness explicitly.
