= RISE controllers =

Robust nonlinear control to achieve exponential stabilization

The robust integral of the sign of the error controllers or RISE controllers constitute a class of continuous robust control algorithms developed for nonlinear, control‐affine systems subject to uncertainties and disturbances. Distinguished by their capability to guarantee asymptotic tracking of reference trajectories even in the presence of bounded modeling errors, RISE controllers can be used where the exact system dynamics are unknown. Recent theoretical advancements have further extended these results to prove exponential stability under appropriate conditions.

== Introduction ==
RISE controllers are designed for nonlinear systems that can be expressed in the control‐affine form

$\dot{x} = d(x,t) + u$

where $x$ represents the system state, $d(x,t)$ encapsulates modeling uncertainties and external disturbances, and $u$ is the control input. The methodology employs a continuous control signal that incorporates an integral of the sign of the tracking error, thereby avoiding the chattering typically associated with conventional sliding mode controllers. The control design is underpinned by a Lyapunov stability analysis that utilizes an auxiliary function, often referred to as the P-function, to establish both asymptotic and exponential stability.

== Theoretical framework ==
=== Control law formulation ===
For a control‐affine nonlinear system, the RISE control law is formulated as
$$u = \dot{x}_d - \alpha e - \hat{d}$$
where $\dot{x}_d$ is the time derivative of the desired trajectory, $e = x - x_d$ represents the tracking error, and $\alpha>0$ is a constant control gain. In order to compensate for uncertainties, an auxiliary term $\hat{d}$ is dynamically updated according to
$$\dot{\hat{d}} = k\,r + e + \beta\,\operatorname{sgn}(e)$$
in which $r=\dot{e}+\alpha e$ is a filtered version of the tracking error, and $k$ as well as $\beta$ are positive control gains. The signum function, $\operatorname{sgn}(e)$, is incorporated to ensure robust compensation against disturbances, thereby driving the tracking error toward zero.

=== Lyapunov stability and the P-function ===
A central element of the RISE controller design is the construction of a Lyapunov function that verifies the stability of the closed-loop system. The P-function, an auxiliary construct employed in the stability analysis, is used to demonstrate that the derivative of the Lyapunov function is negative definite. Early analyses based on the P-function established asymptotic stability, while more recent studies have refined its design to show that, under suitable gain selection, the closed-loop system achieves exponential stability.

== Applications and extensions ==
RISE controllers have been applied across a broad spectrum of engineering domains. In robotics, for example, they have been deployed for the precise control of manipulators, autonomous underwater vehicles, and mobile robots, where the ability to handle significant uncertainties is critical. The versatility of the RISE methodology has also led to its adoption in state estimation, distributed optimization, aerospace control for unmanned aerial vehicles, and precision control in hydraulic systems. Over time, several extensions to the standard RISE framework have been developed, including adaptive strategies that incorporate classical adaptive control techniques to manage structured uncertainties, neural network-based implementations for enhanced nonlinear function approximation, and modifications designed to address issues such as input saturation and time delays
