= J. Karl Hedrick =

- Born: August 26, 1944
- Died: February 22, 2017 (aged 72); Berkeley, CA
- Education: Stanford University (Ph.D., M.S.) University of Michigan (B.S.)
- Known for: Nonlinear Control
- Awards: Rufus Oldenburger Medal (2006)
- Scientific career
- Fields: Control Theory
- Workplaces: Massachusetts Institute of Technology, Arizona State University, University of California, Berkeley

J. Karl Hedrick (August 26, 1944 – February 22, 2017) was an American control theorist and a professor in the Department of Mechanical Engineering at the University of California, Berkeley. He made seminal contributions in nonlinear control and estimation. Prior to joining the faculty at the University of California, Berkeley he was a professor at the Massachusetts Institute of Technology from 1974 to 1988. Hedrick received a bachelor's degree in Engineering Mechanics from the University of Michigan (1966) and a M.S. and Ph.D. from Stanford University (1970, 1971).

Hedrick was the head of the Vehicle Dynamics and Control Laboratory at UC Berkeley. He led Partners for Advanced Transit and Highways Research Center (1997–2003), which conducts research in advanced vehicle control systems, advanced traffic management and information systems, and technology leading to an automated highway systems.

He wrote two books and published more than 140 peer-reviewed archival publications, and graduated over 70 Ph.D. students in his career at MIT, Arizona State, and Berkeley.

He was awarded the Rufus Oldenburger Medal from the American Society of Mechanical Engineers in 2006 and was elected to the National Academy of Engineering in 2014.
