= Colin Cherry =

British cognitive scientist

- Born: 23 June 1914; St Albans, England
- Died: 23 November 1979 (aged 65); London, England
- Education: Northampton Polytechnic
- Known for: Cocktail party problem
- Scientific career
- Fields: Electronic engineer and cognitive scientist
- Workplaces: Hirst Research Centre; Ministry of Aircraft Production; RSRE; Manchester University; Imperial College
- Academic advisors: Norbert Wiener
- Doctoral students: Bruce Sayers; John Hugh Westcott
- Other notable students: George Zames

Edward Colin Cherry (23 June 1914 – 23 November 1979) was a British cognitive scientist whose main contributions were in focused auditory attention, specifically the cocktail party problem regarding the capacity to follow one conversation while many other conversations are going on in a noisy room. Cherry used shadowing tasks to study this problem, which involve playing two different auditory messages to a participant's left and right ears and instructing them to attend to only one. The participant must then shadow this attended message.

Cherry found that very little information about the unattended message was obtained by his participants: physical characteristics were detected but semantic characteristics were not. Cherry therefore concluded that unattended auditory information receives very little processing and that we use physical differences between messages to select which one we attend.

He was born in St Albans in 1914 and educated at St Albans School and Northampton Polytechnic (now City University) gaining his B.Sc. in 1936. After the war, during which he worked on radar research with the British Ministry of Aircraft Production, he taught at the Manchester College of Technology and then Imperial College London. He was awarded the D.Sc. in 1956 and presented the Bernard Price Memorial Lecture in 1958. From 1957 until 1966, he served as one of three founding editors of Information and Control. He was appointed to the Chair of Telecommunications at Imperial College in 1958. In 1978 he was elected to a Marconi International Fellowship. His writings include On Human Communication (1957) and World Communication: Threat or Promise (1971).

== Bibliography ==
- Cherry, Colin (1985). William Edmondson (ed.). The Age of Access - Information Technology and Social Revolution. Croom Helm. ISBN 0709934580.
- Cherry, Colin (1971). World Communication: Threat or Promise. John Wiley.
- Cherry, Colin (1966). On human communication. MIT Press.
- Cherry, Colin (1949). Pulses and transients in communication circuits: an introduction to network transient analysis for television and radar engineers. Chapman & Hall.
