= Neville Hogan =

Irish-American neuroscientist

Neville Hogan is an Irish-American engineer currently the Sun Jae Professor of Mechanical Engineering at Massachusetts Institute of Technology and holds honorary doctorates from Delft University of Technology and Dublin Institute of Technology. Hogan’s research is broad and multi-disciplinary, extending from biology to engineering—he has made significant contributions to motor neuroscience, rehabilitation engineering and robotics—but his focus converges on an emerging class of machines designed to cooperate physically with humans. His work pioneered the creation of robots sufficiently gentle to provide physiotherapy to frail and elderly patients recovering from neurological injury such as stroke, a novel therapy that has already proven its clinical significance.

== Education ==
Hogan graduated in 1970 from the Dublin Institute of Technology with a Bachelors of Engineering. In 1977 he earned a P.h.D from MIT.

== Awards and honors ==
He received the Rufus Oldenburger Medal in 2009 and in 2021 received the Pioneer in Robotics and Automation Award, IEEE Robotics and Automation Society. Additional awards he has won are the following:

- 2018 IEEE Engineering in Medicine and Biology Society (EMBS) Academic Career Achievement Award
- 2020 St. Patrick's Day Medal for Academia, Science Foundation Ireland
- 2008 Henry M. Paynter Outstanding Investigator Award, American Society of Mechanical Engineers, Dynamic Systems and Control Division
