= Peter E. Caines =

- Born: March 8, 1945 (age 81)
- Education: Oxford University, Imperial College London
- Scientific career
- Fields: Control theory, Electrical Engineering
- Workplaces: McGill University
- Doctoral advisor: David Mayne

Peter Edwin Caines, FRSC (born March 8, 1945) is a control theorist and James McGill Professor and Macdonald Chair in Department of Electrical and Computer Engineering at McGill University, Montreal, Quebec, Canada, which he joined in 1980.

He is a Fellow of the IEEE, SIAM, IFAC, the Institute of Mathematics and its Applications, the Canadian Institute for Advanced Research and Royal Society of Canada. He is the recipient of Bode Lecture Prize in 2009 for fundamental contributions in the areas of stochastic, adaptive, large scale and hybrid systems. He initiated the Mean Field Games (or Nash Certainty Equivalence) in engineering with Minyi Huang and Roland Malhame for the analysis and control of large population stochastic dynamic systems.

During 1992-95, he served on the Board of Governors of the IEEE Control Systems Society, was a Member of the Scientific Advisory Board of the Max Planck Society from 2002 to 2007. In 2013 he received a Queen Elizabeth II Diamond Jubilee Medal for services to the community and to Canada.

== Selected publications ==
- P. E. Caines, Linear Stochastic Systems, John Wiley, 1988.
- M.Y. Huang, R.P. Malhame and P.E. Caines, "Large Population Stochastic Dynamic Games: Closed-Loop McKean–Vlasov Systems and the Nash Certainty Equivalence Principle," Communications in Information and Systems. Vol 6, Number 3, 2006, pp 221–252.
- Goodwin, G.; Ramadge, P.J.; Caines, P.E., "Discrete-time multivariable adaptive control," Automatic Control, IEEE Transactions on, vol.25, no.3, pp. 449,456, Jun 1980.
