= International Journal of Electronics =

Scientific journal

- Discipline: Electronics engineering
- Language: English
- Edited by: Alaa Abunjaileh

Publication details
- Former names: Journal of Electronics (1955—1957); Journal of Electronics and Control (1957—1964)
- History: 1955—present
- Publisher: Taylor & Francis
- Frequency: Monthly
- Impact factor: 1.1 (2024)

Standard abbreviations
- ISO 4: Int. J. Electron.

Indexing
- CODEN: IJELA2
- ISSN: 0020-7217 (print); 1362-3060 (web)

Links
- Journal homepage; Online access; Online archive

International Journal of Electronics is a peer-reviewed scientific journal published monthly by Taylor & Francis. It covers research on electronics and electronics engineering, including power electronics, digital electronics, embedded systems and microwave engineering. Its current editor-in-chief is Alaa Abunjaileh (University of Leeds).

The journal was established in 1955 under the name Journal of Electronics, Retitled to Journal of Electronics and Control in 1957, the journal split into International Journal of Electronics and International Journal of Control in 1964.

== Abstracting and indexing ==
The journal is abstracted and indexed in:

- Current Contents/Electronics & Telecommunications
- Current Contents/Engineering, Computing & Technology
- EBSCO databases
- Ei Compendex
- ProQuest databases
- Science Citation Index Expanded
- Scopus
- zbMATH Open

According to the Journal Citation Reports, the journal has a 2024 impact factor of 1.1.
