= John Westcott (footballer) =

English footballer

Personal information
- Full name: John Peter James Westcott
- Date of birth: 31 May 1979 (age 47)
- Place of birth: Eastbourne, England
- Position: Winger

Youth career
- Brighton & Hove Albion

Senior career*
Years	Team	Apps	(Gls)
1996–2000	Brighton & Hove Albion	42	(0)
1999	→ Newport (IOW) (loan)		
2000	→ Sutton United (loan)		
2000–2004	Eastbourne Borough	180	(56)
2004–07	Horsham	192	(38)
2007–2009	Tonbridge Angels	65	(14)
2009–2010	Horsham YMCA	41	(20)
2010–2012	Redhill	82	(12)
2012-2014	Ringmer	40	(4)
2014	East Grinstead Town	3	(0)
- * Club domestic league appearances and goals as of 17:02, 22 March 2016 (UTC)

John Westcott (born 31 May 1979) is an English retired professional footballer.

== Biography ==
Westcott began his career playing for Brighton & Hove Albion in the Football League. After this, he also played the non-league football category for Eastbourne Borough, Horsham, Tonbridge Angels, Horsham YMCA, and Redhill.

In April 2021, he gained the award, "Man of the Match" for Sands United Brighton and Hove, after scoring a 40-yard screamer vs Sussex Dynamos.

== Honours ==
Eastbourne Borough (2000–2004)

- Southern League: Eastern Division Runners Up: 2002–03

Horsham (2004–2007)

- Isthmian League Division One Runners-up: 2005–06
