= Mcity =

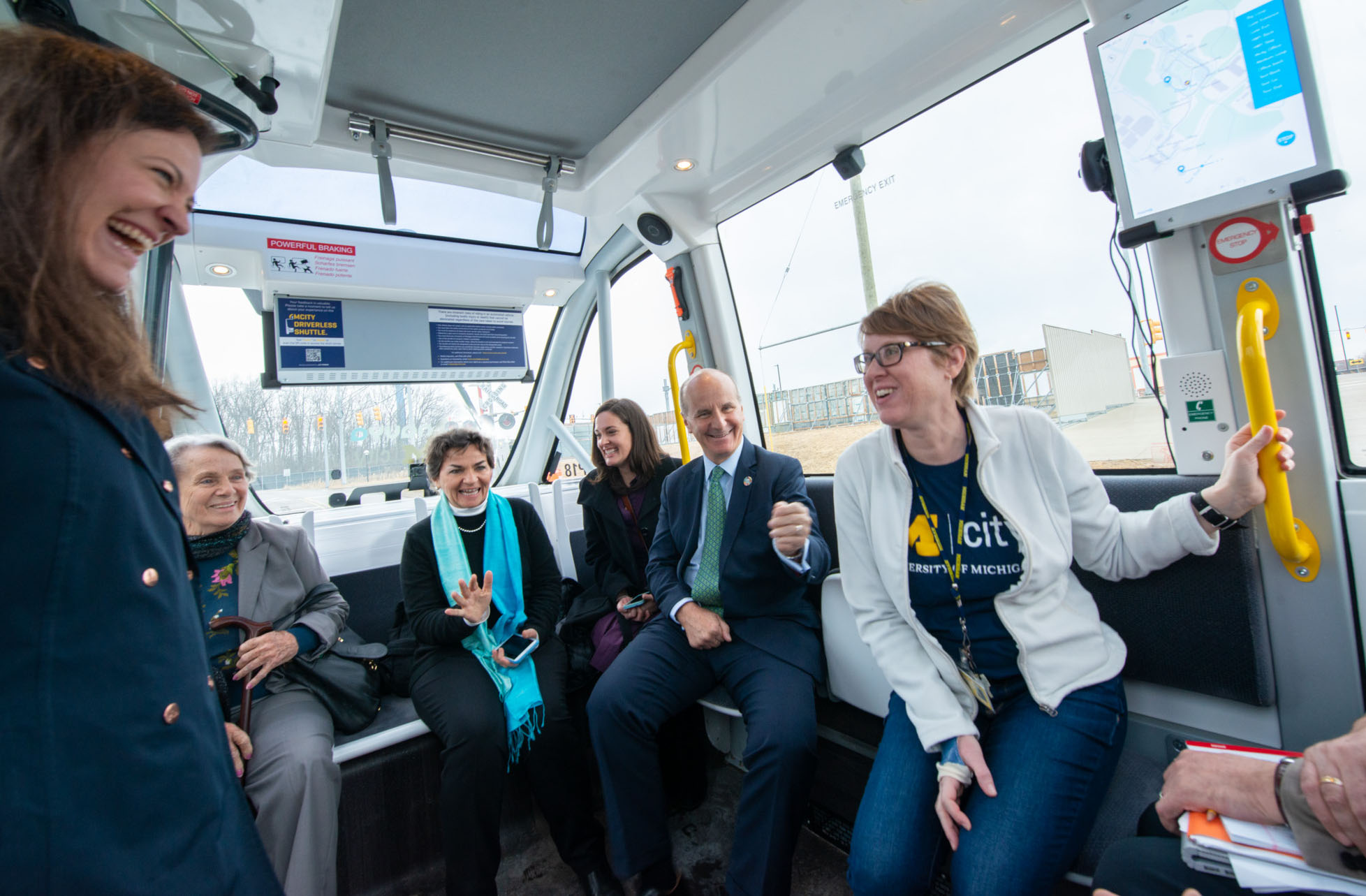
- Christiana Figueres tours an autonomous vehicle at Mcity in 2019

General information
- Type: Autonomous vehicle proving ground
- Location: Ann Arbor, Michigan, U.S.
- Coordinates: 42.3008°N 83.6981°W
- Opened: July 20, 2015; 11 years ago
- Owner: University of Michigan

Website
- mcity.umich.edu

Mcity is a 32-acre (13 ha) mock city and proving ground built for the testing of wirelessly connected and driverless cars located on the University of Michigan North Campus in Ann Arbor, Michigan. The project, which officially opened on July 20, 2015, is built on land purchased by the university from a former Pfizer facility. It cost US$10 million and is collaboratively managed by Mcity (formerly the Mobility Transformation Center - MTC). In November 2015, Ford Motor Company announced that it is the first car company to use the new facility.

== Features ==
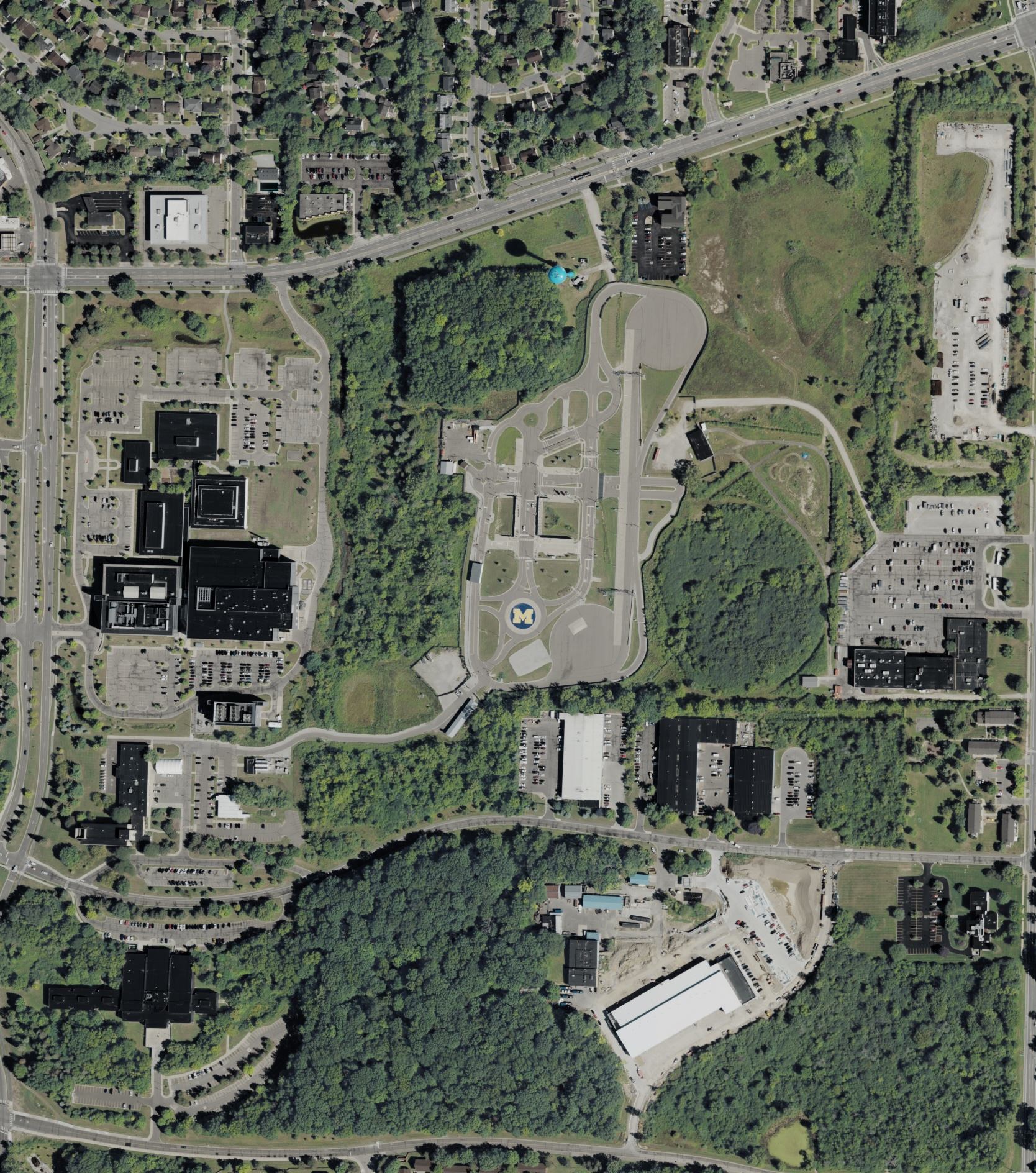
Mcity (center) in a 2023 orthophoto

Mcity is the world's first controlled environment specifically designed to test the potential of connected and automated vehicle technologies that are expected to lead the way to mass-market driverless cars. Students and faculty in the University of Michigan College of Engineering utilize Mcity to work on projects and to collaborate with automakers and suppliers who will test vehicle technology at the course.

The site includes 4.25 lane miles of roadway that include several familiar features of urban driving, including signalized intersections, a railroad crossing, a roundabout, a traffic circle, brick and gravel roads, and parking spaces. Building facades can be moved and fake pedestrians can be altered for different kinds of tests. There are two simulated highway entrance ramps with ramp metering. Two features - a metal bridge and a tunnel - are a special challenge for wireless signals and radar sensors to get through.

== Aims ==
The research aims to test and improve connected and autonomous cars, decrease the chance of collisions, and improve TrafficCom c flow in real life. Connected cars can either communicate with one another (vehicle-to-vehicle, or V2V) or with pieces of the infrastructure, such as traffic lights, that are located near roadways (vehicle-to-infrastructure, or V2I). These communications could one day predict accidents and stop cars before a mishap.

== See also ==
- American Center for Mobility
