= SpineGuard =

SpineGuard, S.A. is a French company that develops and markets probes for the enhancement of spine surgery. The probes, termed PediGuard devices, assist spine surgeons in more accurately drilling a pilot hole in preparation for pedicle screw insertion.

== History ==
Founded in 2009 in France and the USA by Pierre Jérôme and Stéphane Bette, SpineGuard is an innovative company deploying its proprietary radiation-free real time sensing technology DSG® (Dynamic Surgical Guidance) to secure and streamline the placement of implants in the skeleton. DSG® was co-invented by Maurice Bourlion, Ph.D., Ciaran Bolger, M.D., Ph.D., and Alain Vanquaethem, Biomedical Engineer.

SpineGuard designs, develops and markets medical devices embedding its technology.

Over 100,000 surgical procedures have been performed worldwide due to DSG®. Building on its strategic partnerships, SpineGuard has announced it's expanding the scope of its DSG® technology to the treatment of scoliosis via anterior approach, sacroiliac joint fusion, dental implants and more recent technology such as the "smart" pedicle screw, surgical power drill, or surgical robotics.

In 2013, SpineGuard went public (ALSGD). It is currently traded on the AlterNext exchange in France.

The corporate headquarters of SpineGuard are in Vincennes, near Paris, France. To support the DSG Technology and its adoption in the US market, SpineGuard Inc. maintains a sales and marketing office in Boulder, Colorado. SpineGuard also has sales coverage with a network of about 45 distributors worldwide.

== Technology ==
The DSG Technology is based on the differential electrical conductivity of various tissue types. It has been determined that blood, neural and vascular tissue have the most conductivity, cancellous bone has medium conductivity, and cortical bone has the least conductivity of all tissues that are encountered during a typical spinal fusion procedure. Audible and visual signals indicate tissue type based on measurements of electrical conductivity.

SpineGuard products prepare the pilot hole for pedicle screw placement during spine surgery. The PediGuard probes address various spine pathologies and surgical approaches. The PediGuard probe is FDA-cleared and CE-marked, but it is not cleared for use in the cervical spine by the FDA in the US.

The PediGuard probe is a stand-alone, handheld device that can detect possible vertebral cortex perforation during pedicle preparation for screw placement. The PediGuard probes can alert the surgeon prior to a breach by accurately analyzing the electrical conductivity of the surrounding tissues in real-time. This, in turn, can prevent a cortical breach and also help the surgeon redirect the probe and advance down the desired path. Clinical studies have shown that the PediGuard devices can reduce radiation exposure and screw placement time during the spinal procedure.
