= Masayoshi Tomizuka =

Mechanical engineer (born 1946)

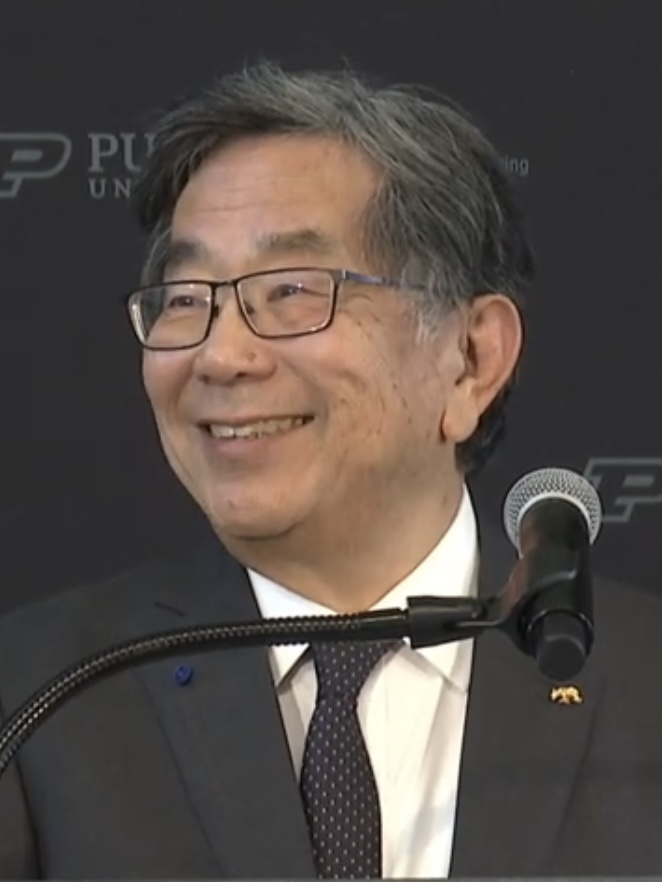
- Tomizuka in 2023
- Born: March 31, 1946 (age 80); Tokyo, Japan
- Education: Keio University (B.S. & M.S.); MIT (PhD)
- Known for: Adaptive control, Preview Control, Zero Phase Error Tracking Control
- Awards: Rufus Oldenburger Medal (2002)
- Scientific career
- Fields: Control Theory
- Workplaces: University of California, Berkeley

Masayoshi Tomizuka is a professor in Control Theory in Department of Mechanical Engineering, University of California, Berkeley. He holds the Cheryl and John Neerhout, Jr., Distinguished Professorship Chair. Tomizuka received his B.S. and M.S. degrees in mechanical engineering from Keio University, Tokyo, Japan in 1968 and 1970, and his Ph.D. in mechanical engineering from the Massachusetts Institute of Technology in February 1974. He was elected to the National Academy of Engineering in 2022.

== Career ==
Tomizuka joined the faculty of the Department of Mechanical Engineering at the University of California, Berkeley in 1974. He served as vice chair of mechanical engineering in charge of instruction from December 1989 to December 1991, and as vice chair in charge of graduate studies from July 1995 to December 1996. Since June 11, 2009, he has been executive associate dean for the College of Engineering at UC Berkeley. He also served as program director of the Dynamic Systems and Control Program at the National Science Foundation from Sept. 2002 to Dec. 2004.

== Research interests ==
Tomizuka's current research interests include optimal and adaptive control, digital control, signal processing, motion control, and control problems related to robotics, manufacturing, data storage devices, vehicles and human-machine systems.

== Society activities ==
Tomizuka has been and is an active member of the Dynamic Systems and Control Division (DSCD) of the American Society of Mechanical Engineers (ASME). He served as chairman of the executive committee of the Division (1986–87), Technical Editor of the ASME Journal of Dynamic Systems, Measurement and Control, J-DSMC (1988–93) and editor-in-chief of the IEEE/ASME Transactions on Mechatronics (1997–99). He served as president of the American Automatic Control Council (1998–99). He chairs the IFAC Technical Committee on Mechatronic Systems. He is a Fellow of the ASME, the Institute of Electric and Electronics Engineers (IEEE) and the Society of Manufacturing Engineers. He is the recipient of the Best J-DSMC Best Paper Award (1995), the DSCD Outstanding Investigator Award (1996), the Pi Tau Sigma-ASME Charles Russ Richards Memorial Award (1997), the DSCD Leadership Award (2000), the Rufus Oldenburger Medal (2002) and the John R. Ragazzini Award (2006). The Oldenburger Medal was awarded to him for his seminal contributions in the area of adaptive control, preview control and zero-phase control.
