= John Westcott (computer scientist) =

British computer scientist

John Westcott FRS FREng
- Born: John Hugh Westcott; 3 November 1920
- Died: 10 October 2014 (aged 93)
- Awards: Fellow of the Royal Society (1983)
- Scientific career
- Fields: Control Systems
- Workplaces: Imperial College London
- Thesis: Studies in Analysis of Servomechanisms with the Development of a New Performance Criterion (1951)
- Doctoral advisor: Colin Cherry
- Doctoral students: Sanjoy K. Mitter; David Mayne; Kevin Warwick

John Hugh Westcott (3 November 1920 – 10 October 2014) was a British scientist specialising in control systems and Professor of Computing and Automation at Imperial College London.

== Career ==
Westcott was educated at Wandsworth Grammar School, the City and Guilds College, both in London, and the Massachusetts Institute of Technology. His career began in radar research during World War II. After a year in Germany with the Allied Commission, he obtained a scholarship to the MIT where many scientists returning from the services were addressing the early possibilities of computer applications.

He was the first to lecture on the new field of cybernetics in Britain and was a member of the Ratio Club with Grey Walter, Alan Turing, Giles Brindley and others from various fields, who met between 1949 and 1952 to discuss brain mechanisms and related issues. He researched servo-mechanisms at Imperial College London, where he headed the new Department of Computing and Control from 1966. A founder-member in 1957 of the International Federation of Automatic Control, one of the first professional bodies to liaise successfully across the Iron Curtain, he was a consultant to companies such as Shell, ICI, Westlands and British Steel Corporation in applying control systems to large and complex processes. In the 1970s and 1980s he also worked on macro-economic modelling and computer modelling for policy-evaluation.

== Awards and honours ==
Westcott was elected a Fellow of the Royal Society (FRS) in 1983 and a Fellow of the Royal Academy of Engineering (FREng) in 1980.
