= Isaac Horowitz =

Scientist born in British mandate of Palestine

Isaac Horowitz (December 15, 1920 - 2005) was a notable scientist with significant contributions to automatic control theory. He developed and championed the Quantitative Feedback Theory which for the first time introduced a formal combination of the genuine frequency methodology founded by Hendrik Bode with plant uncertainty considerations.

== Biography ==
Isaac Horowitz was born one of 11 siblings in the British mandate of Palestine, modern Israel, in the city of Safed. His family moved to New York City when he was five years old and shortly thereafter settled in Winnipeg, Manitoba, Canada. He received the B.Sc. in Physics and Mathematics from the University of Manitoba in 1944. In 1948, he received a B.Sc. degree in electrical engineering from MIT. Between 1951 and 1956, he was a full-time instructor and a part-time graduate student at the Polytechnic University of New York from which he obtained his M.E.E. and D.E.E..
