= Control engineering =

Engineering discipline that deals with control systems

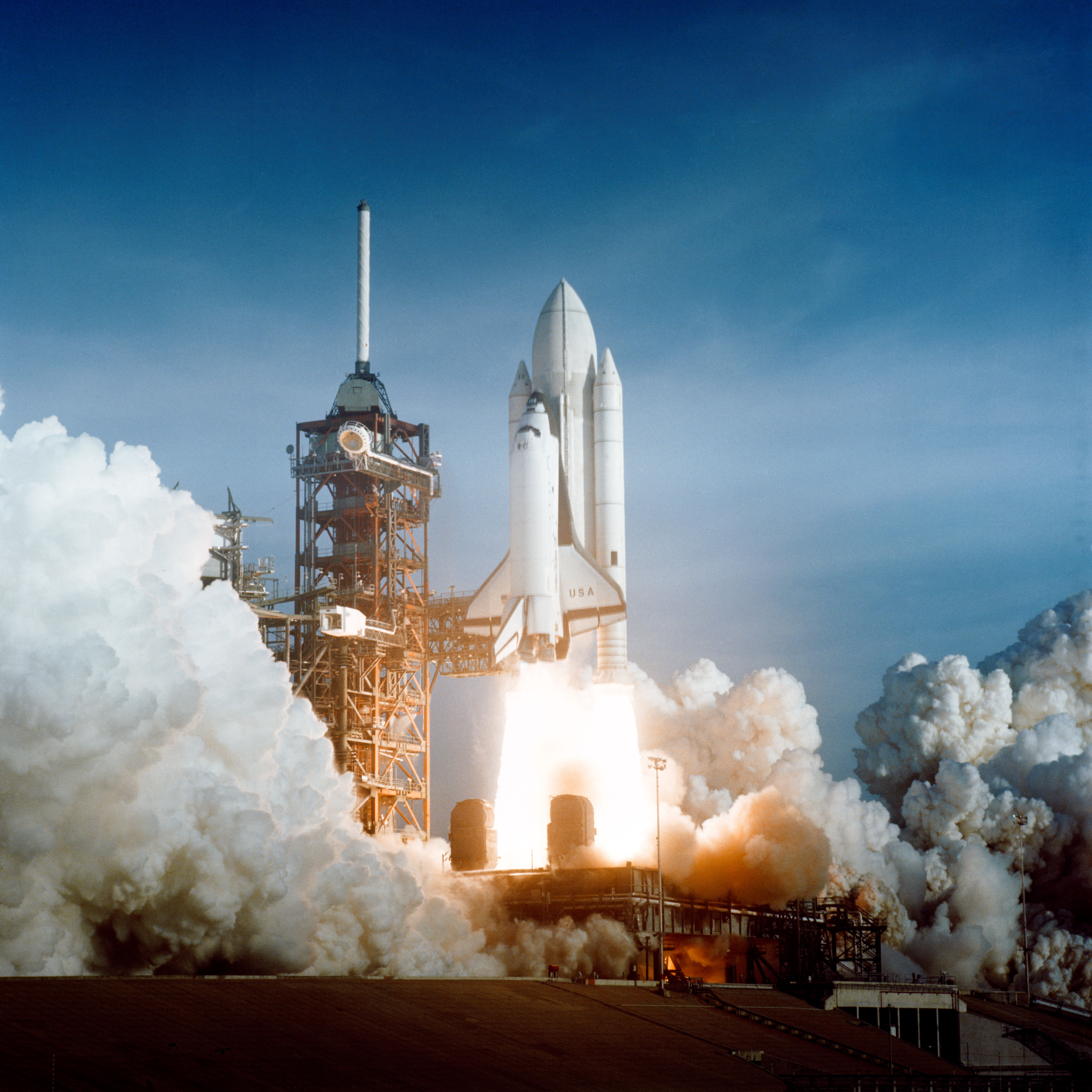
Control systems play a critical role in space flight.

Control engineering, also known as control systems engineering and, in some European countries, automation engineering, is an engineering discipline that deals with control systems, applying control theory to design equipment and systems with desired behaviors in control environments. The discipline of controls overlaps and is usually taught along with electrical engineering, chemical engineering and mechanical engineering at many institutions around the world.

The practice uses sensors and detectors to measure the output performance of the process being controlled; these measurements are used to provide corrective feedback helping to achieve the desired performance. Systems designed to perform without requiring human input are called automatic control systems (such as cruise control for regulating the speed of a car). Multi-disciplinary in nature, control systems engineering activities focus on implementation of control systems mainly derived by mathematical modeling of a diverse range of systems.

== Overview ==
Modern day control engineering is a relatively new field of study that gained significant attention during the 20th century with the advancement of technology. It can be broadly defined or classified as the practical application of control theory. Control engineering plays an essential role in a wide range of control systems, from simple household washing machines to high-performance fighter aircraft. It seeks to understand physical systems, using mathematical modelling, in terms of inputs, outputs and various components with different behaviors; to use control system design tools to develop controllers for those systems; and to implement controllers in physical systems employing available technology. A system can be mechanical, electrical, fluid, chemical, financial or biological, and its mathematical modelling, analysis and controller design use control theory in one or more of the time, frequency and complex-s domains, depending on the nature of the design problem.

Control engineering is the engineering discipline that focuses on the modeling of a diverse range of dynamic systems (e.g. mechanical systems) and the design of controllers that will cause these systems to behave in the desired manner. Although such controllers need not be electrical, many are, and hence control engineering is often viewed as a subfield of electrical engineering.

Electrical circuits, digital signal processors and microcontrollers can all be used to implement control systems. Control engineering has a wide range of applications from the flight and propulsion systems of commercial airliners to the cruise control present in many modern automobiles.

In most cases, control engineers utilize feedback when designing control systems. This is often accomplished using a proportional–integral–derivative controller (PID controller) system. For example, in an automobile with cruise control the vehicle's speed is continuously monitored and fed back to the system, which adjusts the motor's torque accordingly. Where there is regular feedback, control theory can be used to determine how the system responds to such feedback. In practically all such systems, stability is important, and control theory can help ensure stability is achieved.

Although feedback is an important aspect of control engineering, control engineers may also work on the control of systems without feedback. This is known as open loop control. A classic example of open loop control is a washing machine that runs through a pre-determined cycle without the use of sensors.

== History ==
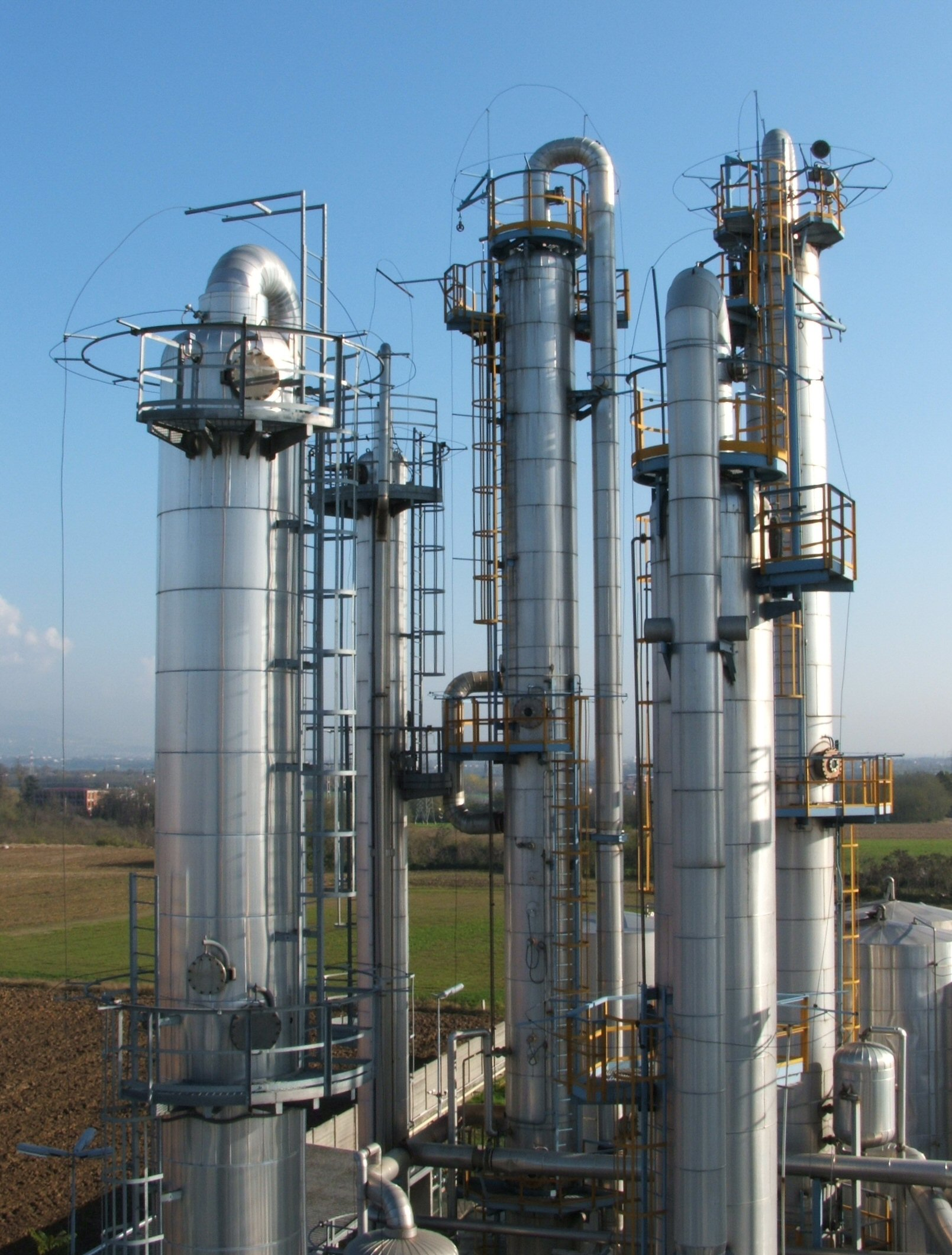
Control of fractionating columns is one of the more challenging applications.

Automatic control systems were first developed over two thousand years ago. The first feedback control device on record is thought to be Ktesibios's water clock in Alexandria, Egypt, around the third century BCE. It kept time by regulating the water level in a vessel and, therefore, the water flow from that vessel. Water clocks of similar design were still being made in Baghdad when the Mongols captured the city in 1258 CE. A variety of automatic devices have been used over the centuries to accomplish useful tasks or simply to entertain. The latter include the automata, popular in Europe in the 17th and 18th centuries, featuring dancing figures that would repeat the same task over and over; these automata are examples of open-loop control. Milestones among feedback, or "closed-loop", automatic control devices include the temperature regulator of a furnace attributed to Drebbel, circa 1620, and the centrifugal flyball governor used for regulating the speed of steam engines by James Watt in 1788.

In his 1868 paper "On Governors", James Clerk Maxwell explained instabilities exhibited by the flyball governor using differential equations to describe the control system. This demonstrated the importance and usefulness of mathematical models and methods in understanding complex phenomena, and it signaled the beginning of mathematical control and systems theory. Elements of control theory had appeared earlier but not as dramatically and convincingly as in Maxwell's analysis.

Control theory made significant strides over the next century. New mathematical techniques, as well as advances in electronic and computer technologies, made it possible to control significantly more complex dynamical systems than the original flyball governor could stabilize. New mathematical techniques included developments in optimal control in the 1950s and 1960s, followed by progress in stochastic, robust, adaptive and nonlinear control methods in the 1970s and 1980s. Applications of control methodology have helped to make possible space travel and communication satellites, safer and more efficient aircraft, cleaner automobile engines, and cleaner and more efficient chemical processes.

Before it emerged as a unique discipline, control engineering was practiced as a part of mechanical engineering, and control theory was studied as a part of electrical engineering, since electrical circuits can often be easily described using control theory techniques. In the first control relationships, a current output was represented by a voltage control input. However, lacking adequate technology to implement electrical control systems, designers were left with the option of less efficient and slower- responding mechanical systems. A mechanical controller that is still used in some hydro plants is the governor. Later on, before modern power electronics, process control systems for industrial applications were devised by mechanical engineers using pneumatic and hydraulic control devices, many of which are still in use today.

=== Mathematical modelling ===
David Quinn Mayne (1930–2024) was among the early developers of a rigorous mathematical method for analysing Model predictive control (MPC) algorithms. MPC is used in tens of thousands of applications and is a core part of the advanced control technology offered by hundreds of process control producers. A major strength of MPC is its capacity to deal with nonlinearities and hard constraints in a simple and intuitive fashion. Mayne's work underpins a class of algorithms that are provably correct, heuristically explainable, and yield control system designs which meet practically important objectives.

== Control systems ==
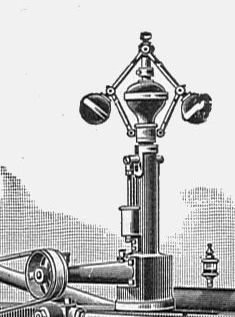
The centrifugal governor is an early proportional control mechanism.

A control system manages, commands, directs, or regulates the behavior of other devices or systems using control loops. It can range from a single home heating controller using a thermostat controlling a domestic boiler to large industrial control systems which are used for controlling processes or machines. The control systems are designed via control engineering process.

For continuously modulated control, a feedback controller is used to automatically control a process or operation. The control system compares the value or status of the process variable (PV) being controlled with the desired value or setpoint (SP), and applies the difference as a control signal to bring the process variable output of the plant to the same value as the setpoint.

For sequential and combinational logic, software logic, such as in a programmable logic controller, is used.

== Control theory ==
Control theory is a field of control engineering and applied mathematics that deals with the control of dynamical systems. The aim is to develop a model or algorithm governing the application of system inputs to drive the system to a desired state, while minimizing any delay, overshoot, or steady-state error and ensuring a level of control stability; often with the aim to achieve a degree of optimality.

To do this, a controller with the requisite corrective behavior is required. This controller monitors the controlled process variable (PV), and compares it with the reference or set point (SP). The difference between actual and desired value of the process variable, called the error signal, or SP-PV error, is applied as feedback to generate a control action to bring the controlled process variable to the same value as the set point. Other aspects which are also studied are controllability and observability. Control theory is used in control system engineering to design automation that have revolutionized manufacturing, aircraft, communications and other industries, and created new fields such as robotics.

Extensive use is usually made of a diagrammatic style known as the block diagram. In it the transfer function, also known as the system function or network function, is a mathematical model of the relation between the input and output based on the differential equations describing the system.

Control theory dates from the 19th century, when the theoretical basis for the operation of governors was first described by James Clerk Maxwell. Control theory was further advanced by Edward Routh in 1874, Charles Sturm and in 1895, Adolf Hurwitz, who all contributed to the establishment of control stability criteria; and from 1922 onwards, the development of PID control theory by Nicolas Minorsky. Although the most direct application of mathematical control theory is its use in control systems engineering (dealing with process control systems for robotics and industry), control theory is routinely applied to problems both the natural and behavioral sciences. As the general theory of feedback systems, control theory is useful wherever feedback occurs, making it important to fields like economics, operations research, and the life sciences.

== Education ==
At many universities around the world, control engineering courses are taught primarily in electrical engineering and mechanical engineering, but some courses are taught in mechatronics engineering and aerospace engineering. At others, control engineering is connected to computer science, as most control techniques today are implemented through computers, often as embedded systems (as in the automotive field). The field of control within chemical engineering is often known as process control. It deals primarily with the control of variables in a chemical process in a plant. It is taught as part of the undergraduate chemical engineering curriculum and employs many of the same principles as control engineering. Other engineering disciplines also overlap with control engineering, as it can be applied to any system for which a suitable model can be derived. However, specialised control engineering departments and degrees do exist. For example, several master's degrees in Automation & Robotics in Italy are fully specialised in control engineering. Other examples include the Department of Automatic Control and Systems Engineering at the University of Sheffield, the Department of Robotics and Control Engineering at the United States Naval Academy and the Department of Control and Automation Engineering at Istanbul Technical University.

Control engineering has diverse applications, including in science, finance management and human behavior. Students of control engineering may start with a linear control systems course dealing with the time and complex-s domains, known as classical control theory, which requires a thorough background in elementary mathematics and the Laplace transform. In linear control, students perform frequency-domain and time- domain analysis. Digital control and nonlinear control courses require Z transformation and algebra respectively, and typically complete a basic control education.

== Careers ==
A career in control engineering typically begins with a bachelor's degree and may continue through further study. Control engineering degrees are typically paired with an electrical or mechanical engineering degree, but can also be paired with a degree in chemical engineering. According to a Control Engineering survey, most respondents were control engineers in various forms.

Few careers are classified specifically as "control engineer"; most are specific roles that bear some resemblance to the broader field of control engineering. A majority of the control engineers who took the survey in 2019 were system or product designers, or control or instrument engineers. Most of these jobs involve process engineering, production or maintenance, and are variations of control engineering.

Control engineers are employed by aerospace companies, manufacturing companies, automobile companies, power companies, chemical companies, petroleum companies, and government agencies. Employers of control engineers include Rockwell Automation, NASA, Ford, Phillips 66, Eastman, and Goodrich.

In India, control systems engineering is offered at diploma, undergraduate and postgraduate levels. These programs require candidates to have studied physics, chemistry and mathematics in secondary school, or to hold a relevant bachelor's degree for postgraduate studies.

== Recent advancement ==
Originally, control engineering was concerned entirely with continuous systems. The development of computer control tools created a requirement for discrete control system engineering, because the communications between the computer-based digital controller and the physical system are governed by a computer clock. The equivalent of the Laplace transform in the discrete domain is the Z-transform. Today, many control systems are computer- controlled and consist of both digital and analog components.

Therefore, at the design stage either:

- Digital components are mapped into the continuous domain and the design is carried out in the continuous domain, or
- Analog components are mapped into discrete domain and design is carried out there.

The first of these two methods is more commonly encountered in practice because many industrial systems have many continuous system components, including mechanical, fluid, biological and analog electrical components, with a few digital controllers.

Similarly, the design technique has progressed from paper-and-ruler based manual design to computer-aided design and now to computer-automated design or CAD, which has been made possible by evolutionary computation. CAD can be applied not just to tuning a predefined control scheme, but also to controller structure optimisation, system identification and invention of novel control systems, based purely upon a performance requirement, independent of any specific control scheme.

Resilient control systems extend the traditional focus on addressing only planned disturbances and attempt to address multiple types of unexpected disturbance, in particular by adapting and transforming the behavior of the control system in response to malicious actors, abnormal failure modes, undesirable human action and other factors.

== See also ==
- Artificial intelligence
- Automation
- Automation engineering
- Electrical engineering
- Communications engineering
- Satellite navigation
- Outline of control engineering
- Advanced process control
- Building automation
- Computer-automated design (CAutoD, CAutoCSD)
- Control reconfiguration
- Feedback
- H-infinity
- Lead–lag compensator
- List of control engineering topics
- Quantitative feedback theory
- Robotic unicycle
- State space
- Sliding mode control
- Systems engineering
- Testing controller
- VisSim
- Control Engineering (magazine)
- Time series
- Process control system
- Robotic control
- Mechatronics
- SCADA
