= Nonlinear control =

Control theory for nonlinear or time-variant systems

A feedback control system. It is desired to control a system (often called the plant) so its output follows a desired reference signal. A sensor monitors the output and a controller subtracts the actual output from the desired reference output, and applies this error signal to the system to bring the output closer to the reference. In a nonlinear control system at least one of the blocks, system, sensor, or controller, is nonlinear.

Nonlinear control theory is an area of control theory which deals with systems that are nonlinear, time-variant, or both. Control theory is an interdisciplinary branch of engineering and mathematics that is concerned with the behavior of dynamical systems with inputs, and how to modify the output by changes in the input using feedback, feedforward, or signal filtering. The system to be controlled is called the "plant". One way to make the output of a system follow a desired reference signal is to compare the output of the plant to the desired output, and provide feedback to the plant to modify the output to bring it closer to the desired output.

Control theory is divided into two branches. Linear control theory applies to systems made of devices which obey the superposition principle. They are governed by linear differential equations. A major subclass are linear time invariant (LTI) systems which do not change with time. These systems can be solved by with frequency domain mathematical techniques, such as the Laplace transform, Fourier transform, Z transform, Bode plot, root locus, and Nyquist stability criterion.

Nonlinear control theory applies to a wider class of real-world systems that do not obey the superposition principle. These systems are often governed by nonlinear differential equations. The mathematical techniques which have been developed to handle them are less general, often applying only to narrow categories of systems. These include limit cycle theory, Poincaré maps, Lyapunov stability theory, and describing functions. In some circumstances, near a stable point of interest, these systems can be approximated as linear systems through linearization allowing linear techniques to be used. Nonlinear systems are often analyzed using numerical methods on computers, for example by simulating their operation using a simulation language. Even if the plant is linear, a nonlinear controller can often have attractive features such as simpler implementation, faster speed, more accuracy, or reduced control energy, which justify the more difficult design procedure.

An example of a nonlinear control system is a thermostat-controlled heating system. A building heating system such as a furnace has a nonlinear response to changes in temperature; it is either "on" or "off", it does not have the fine control in response to temperature differences that a proportional (linear) device would have. Therefore, the furnace is off until the temperature falls below the "turn on" setpoint of the thermostat, when it turns on. Due to the heat added by the furnace, the temperature increases until it reaches the "turn off" setpoint of the thermostat, which turns the furnace off, and the cycle repeats. This cycling of the temperature about the desired temperature is called a limit cycle, and is characteristic of nonlinear control systems.

== Properties of nonlinear systems ==
Some properties of nonlinear dynamic systems are

- They do not follow the principle of superposition (linearity and homogeneity).
- They may have multiple isolated equilibrium points.
- They may exhibit properties such as limit cycle, bifurcation, chaos.
- Finite escape time: Solutions of nonlinear systems may not exist for all times.

== Analysis and control of nonlinear systems ==
There are several well-developed techniques for analyzing nonlinear feedback systems (see, e.g., and):

- Describing function method
- Phase plane method
- Lyapunov stability analysis
- Singular perturbation method
- The Popov criterion and the circle criterion for absolute stability
- Center manifold theorem
- Small-gain theorem
- Passivity analysis

Control design techniques for nonlinear systems also exist. These can be subdivided into techniques which attempt to treat the system as a linear system in a limited range of operation and use (well-known) linear design techniques for each region:

- Gain scheduling

Those that attempt to introduce auxiliary nonlinear feedback in such a way that the system can be treated as linear for purposes of control design:

- Feedback linearization

And Lyapunov based methods:

- Lyapunov redesign
- Control-Lyapunov function
- Nonlinear damping
- Backstepping
- Sliding mode control

== Nonlinear feedback analysis – The Lur'e problem ==
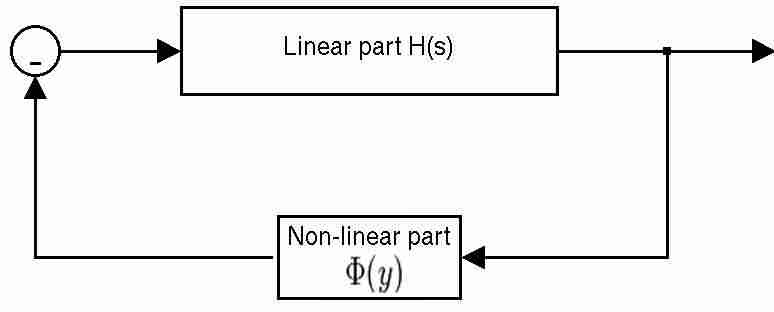
Lur'e problem block diagram

An early nonlinear feedback system analysis problem was formulated by A. I. Lur'e. Control systems described by the Lur'e problem have a forward path that is linear and time-invariant, and a feedback path that contains a memory-less, possibly time-varying, static nonlinearity.

The linear part can be characterized by four matrices (A,B,C,D), while the nonlinear part is Φ(y) with $\frac{\Phi(y)} y \in [a,b],\quad a<b \quad \forall y$ (a sector nonlinearity).

=== Absolute stability problem ===
Consider:

1. (A,B) is controllable and (C,A) is observable
2. two real numbers a, b with a < b, defining a sector for function Φ

The Lur'e problem (also known as the absolute stability problem) is to derive conditions involving only the transfer matrix H(s) and {a,b} such that x = 0 is a globally uniformly asymptotically stable equilibrium of the system.

There are two well-known wrong conjectures on the absolute stability problem:

- The Aizerman's conjecture
- The Kalman's conjecture.

Graphically, these conjectures can be interpreted in terms of graphical restrictions on the graph of Φ(y) x y or also on the graph of dΦ/dy x Φ/y. There are counterexamples to Aizerman's and Kalman's conjectures such that nonlinearity belongs to the sector of linear stability and unique stable equilibrium coexists with a stable periodic solution—hidden oscillation.

There are two main theorems concerning the Lur'e problem which give sufficient conditions for absolute stability:

- The circle criterion (an extension of the Nyquist stability criterion for linear systems)
- The Popov criterion.

== Theoretical results in nonlinear control ==
=== Frobenius theorem ===
The Frobenius theorem is a deep result in differential geometry. When applied to nonlinear control, it says the following: Given a system of the form

$$\dot x = \sum_{i=1}^k f_i(x) u_i(t) \,$$

where $x \in R^n$, $f_1, \dots, f_k$ are vector fields belonging to a distribution $\Delta$ and $u_i(t)$ are control functions, the integral curves of $x$ are restricted to a manifold of dimension $m$ if $\operatorname{span}(\Delta) = m$ and $\Delta$ is an involutive distribution.

== See also ==
- Feedback passivation
- Phase-locked loop
- Small control property
