= Describing function =

In control systems theory, the describing function (DF) method, developed by Nikolay Mitrofanovich Krylov and Nikolay Bogoliubov in the 1930s, and extended by Ralph Kochenburger is an approximate procedure for analyzing certain nonlinear control problems. It is based on quasi-linearization, which is the approximation of the non-linear system under investigation by a linear time-invariant (LTI) transfer function that depends on the amplitude of the input waveform. By definition, a transfer function of a true LTI system cannot depend on the amplitude of the input function because an LTI system is linear. Thus, this dependence on amplitude generates a family of linear systems that are combined in an attempt to capture salient features of the non-linear system behavior. The describing function is one of the few widely applicable methods for designing nonlinear systems, and is very widely used as a standard mathematical tool for analyzing limit cycles in closed-loop controllers, such as industrial process controls, servomechanisms, and electronic oscillators.

== The method ==
Consider feedback around a discontinuous (but piecewise continuous) nonlinearity (e.g., an amplifier with saturation, or an element with deadband effects) cascaded with a slow stable linear system. The continuous region in which the feedback is presented to the nonlinearity depends on the amplitude of the output of the linear system. As the linear system's output amplitude decays, the nonlinearity may move into a different continuous region. This switching from one continuous region to another can generate periodic oscillations. The describing function method attempts to predict characteristics of those oscillations (e.g., their fundamental frequency) by assuming that the slow system acts like a low-pass or bandpass filter that concentrates all energy around a single frequency. Even if the output waveform has several modes, the method can still provide intuition about properties like frequency and possibly amplitude; in this case, the describing function method can be thought of as describing the sliding mode of the feedback system.

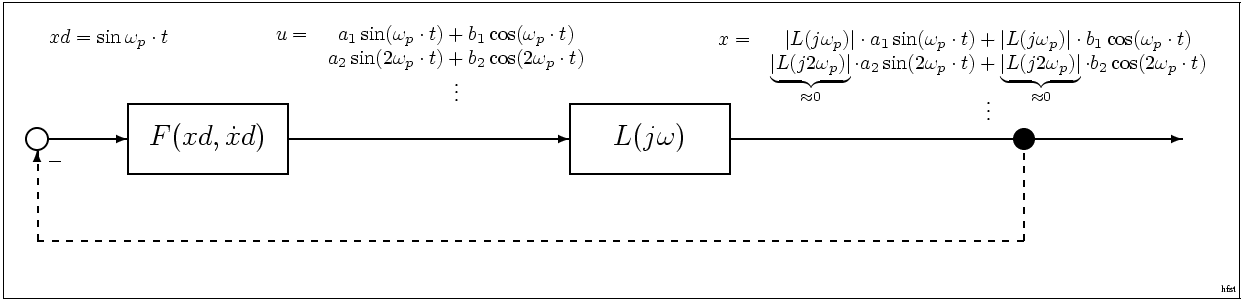
Nonlinear system in the state of harmonic balance

Using this low-pass assumption, the system response can be described by one of a family of sinusoidal waveforms; in this case the system would be characterized by a sine input describing function (SIDF) $H(A,\,j\omega)$ giving the system response to an input consisting of a sine wave of amplitude A and frequency $\omega$. This SIDF is a modification of the transfer function $H(j\omega)$ used to characterize linear systems. In a quasi-linear system, when the input is a sine wave, the output will be a sine wave of the same frequency but with a scaled amplitude and shifted phase as given by $H(A,\,j\omega)$. Many systems are approximately quasi-linear in the sense that although the response to a sine wave is not a pure sine wave, most of the energy in the output is indeed at the same frequency $\omega$ as the input. This is because such systems may possess intrinsic low-pass or bandpass characteristics such that harmonics are naturally attenuated, or because external filters are added for this purpose. An important application of the SIDF technique is to estimate the oscillation amplitude in sinusoidal electronic oscillators.

Other types of describing functions that have been used are DFs for level inputs and for Gaussian noise inputs. Although not a complete description of the system, the DFs often suffice to answer specific questions about control and stability. DF methods are best for analyzing systems with relatively weak nonlinearities. In addition the higher order sinusoidal input describing functions (HOSIDF), describe the response of a class of nonlinear systems at harmonics of the input frequency of a sinusoidal input. The HOSIDFs are an extension of the SIDF for systems where the nonlinearities are significant in the response.

== Caveats ==
Although the describing function method can produce reasonably accurate results for a wide class of systems, it can fail badly for others. For example, the method can fail if the system emphasizes higher harmonics of the nonlinearity. Such examples have been presented by Tzypkin for bang–bang systems. A fairly similar example is a closed-loop oscillator consisting of a non-inverting Schmitt trigger followed by an inverting integrator that feeds back its output to the Schmitt trigger's input. The output of the Schmitt trigger is going to be a square waveform, while that of the integrator (following it) is going to have a triangle waveform with peaks coinciding with the transitions in the square wave. Each of these two oscillator stages lags the signal exactly by 90 degrees (relative to its input). If one were to perform DF analysis on this circuit, the triangle wave at the Schmitt trigger's input would be replaced by its fundamental (sine wave), which passing through the trigger would cause a phase shift of less than 90 degrees (because the sine wave would trigger it sooner than the triangle wave does) so the system would appear not to oscillate in the same (simple) way.

Also, in the case where the conditions for Aizerman's or Kalman conjectures are fulfilled, there are no periodic solutions by describing function method, but counterexamples with hidden periodic attractors are known. Counterexamples to the describing function method can be constructed for discontinuous dynamical systems when a rest segment destroys predicted limit cycles. Therefore, the application of the describing function method requires additional justification.
