= Closed-loop pole =

Positions of a closed-loop transfer function's poles in the s-plane

In systems theory, closed-loop poles are the positions of the poles (or eigenvalues) of a closed-loop transfer function in the s-plane. The open-loop transfer function is equal to the product of all transfer function blocks in the forward path in the block diagram. The closed-loop transfer function is obtained by dividing the open-loop transfer function by the sum of one and the product of all transfer function blocks throughout the negative feedback loop. The closed-loop transfer function may also be obtained by algebraic or block diagram manipulation. Once the closed-loop transfer function is obtained for the system, the closed-loop poles are obtained by solving the characteristic equation. The characteristic equation is nothing more than setting the denominator of the closed-loop transfer function to zero.

In control theory there are two main methods of analyzing feedback systems: the transfer function (or frequency domain) method and the state space method. When the transfer function method is used, attention is focused on the locations in the s-plane where the transfer function is undefined (the poles) or zero (the zeroes; see Zeroes and poles). Two different transfer functions are of interest to the designer. If the feedback loops in the system are opened (that is prevented from operating) one speaks of the open-loop transfer function, while if the feedback loops are operating normally one speaks of the closed-loop transfer function. For more on the relationship between the two, see root-locus.

== Closed-loop poles in control theory ==
The response of a linear time-invariant system to any input can be derived from its impulse response and step response. The eigenvalues of the system determine completely the natural response (unforced response). In control theory, the response to any input is a combination of a transient response and steady-state response. Therefore, a crucial design parameter is the location of the eigenvalues, or closed-loop poles.

In root-locus design, the gain K is usually parameterized. Each point on the locus satisfies the angle condition and magnitude condition and corresponds to a different value of K. For negative feedback systems, the closed-loop poles move along the root-locus from the open-loop poles to the open-loop zeroes as the gain is increased. For this reason, the root-locus is often used for design of proportional control, i.e. those for which $\textbf{G}_c = K$.

== Finding closed-loop poles ==
Consider a simple feedback system with controller $\textbf{G}_c = K$, plant $\textbf{G}(s)$ and transfer function $\textbf{H}(s)$ in the feedback path. Note that a unity feedback system has $\textbf{H}(s)=1$ and the block is omitted. For this system, the open-loop transfer function is the product of the blocks in the forward path, $\textbf{G}_c\textbf{G} = K\textbf{G}$. The product of the blocks around the entire closed loop is $\textbf{G}_c\textbf{G}\textbf{H} = K\textbf{G}\textbf{H}$. Therefore, the closed-loop transfer function is

$$\textbf{T}(s)=\frac{K\textbf{G}}{1+K\textbf{G}\textbf{H}}.$$

The closed-loop poles, or eigenvalues, are obtained by solving the characteristic equation ${1+K\textbf{G}\textbf{H}}=0$. In general, the solution will be n complex numbers where n is the order of the characteristic polynomial.

The preceding is valid for single-input-single-output systems (SISO). An extension is possible for multiple input multiple output systems, that is for systems where $\textbf{G}(s)$ and $\textbf{K}(s)$ are matrices whose elements are made of transfer functions. In this case the poles are the solution of the equation

$$\det(\textbf{I}+\textbf{G}(s)\textbf{K}(s))=0. \,$$
