= Artstein's theorem =

Theorem in control theory

Artstein's theorem states that a nonlinear dynamical system in the control-affine form

$\dot{\mathbf{x}} = \mathbf{f(x)} + \sum_{i=1}^m \mathbf{g}_i(\mathbf{x})u_i$

has a differentiable control-Lyapunov function if and only if it admits a regular stabilizing feedback u(x), that is a locally Lipschitz function on R^{n}\{0}.

The original 1983 proof by Zvi Artstein proceeds by a nonconstructive argument. In 1989 Eduardo D. Sontag provided a constructive version of this theorem explicitly exhibiting the feedback.

== See also ==
- Analysis and control of nonlinear systems
- Control-Lyapunov function
