= Nichols plot =

Chart of a transfer function's phase response vs. magnitude

A Nichols plot.

The Nichols plot is a plot used in signal processing and control design, named after American engineer Nathaniel B. Nichols. It plots the phase response versus the response magnitude of a transfer function for any given frequency, and as such is useful in characterizing a system's frequency response.

== Use in control design ==
Given a transfer function,

$$G(s) = \frac{Y(s)}{X(s)}$$

with the closed-loop transfer function defined as,

$$M(s) = \frac{G(s)}{1+G(s)}$$

the Nichols plots displays $20 \log_{10}(|G(s)|)$ versus $\arg(G(s))$. Loci of constant $20 \log_{10}(|M(s)|)$ and $\arg(M(s))$ (so-called Hall circles) are overlaid to allow the designer to obtain the closed loop transfer function directly from the open loop transfer function. Thus, the frequency $\omega$ is the parameter along the curve. This plot may be compared to the Bode plot in which the two inter-related graphs - $20 \log_{10}(|G(s)|)$ versus $\log_{10}(\omega)$ and $\arg(G(s))$ versus $\log_{10}(\omega)$) - are plotted.

In feedback control design, the plot is useful for assessing the stability and robustness of a linear system. This application of the Nichols plot is central to the quantitative feedback theory (QFT) of Horowitz and Sidi, which is a well known method for robust control system design.

In most cases, $\arg(G(s))$ refers to the phase of the system's response. Although similar to a Nyquist plot, a Nichols plot is plotted in a Polar coordinate system while a Nyquist plot is plotted in a Cartesian coordinate system.

== See also ==
- Hall circles
- Bode plot
- Nyquist plot
- Transfer function
