= Parasympathetic rebound =

Nervous system delayed reaction

Parasympathetic rebound is a possible delayed (over-)reaction of the parasympathetic nervous system.

During intense and/or prolonged stress the opposed sympathetic nervous system via the hormones cortisol and catecholamines (such as adrenaline) suppresses the parasympathetic activities. When this suppression vanishes, the parasympathetic system may overreact, as typical for any Closed-loop transfer function.

== In popular culture ==
In the Midsomer Murders episode Talking to the Dead, the character Cyrus LeVanu dies from parasympathetic rebound. Tom Barnaby translates this as meaning dying "of fright".
