= Pseudo-modal energies =

Pseudo-modal energies are used for estimating the energy content of a mechanical system near its resonance frequencies. They are defined as the integral of the frequency response function within a certain bandwidth around a resonance.
