= Autonomous convergence theorem =

In mathematics, an autonomous convergence theorem is one of a family of related theorems which specify conditions guaranteeing global asymptotic stability of a continuous autonomous dynamical system.

== History ==
The Markus–Yamabe conjecture was formulated as an attempt to give conditions for global stability of continuous dynamical systems in two dimensions. However, the Markus–Yamabe conjecture does not hold for dimensions higher than two, a problem which autonomous convergence theorems attempt to address. The first autonomous convergence theorem was constructed by Russell Smith. This theorem was later refined by Michael Li and James Muldowney.

== An example autonomous convergence theorem ==
A comparatively simple autonomous convergence theorem is as follows:

Let $x$ be a vector in some space $X \subseteq \mathbb{R}^n$, evolving according to an autonomous differential equation $\dot{x} = f(x)$. Suppose that $X$ is convex and forward invariant under $f$, and that there exists a fixed point $\hat{x} \in X$ such that $f(\hat{x}) = 0$. If there exists a logarithmic norm $\mu$ such that the Jacobian $J(x) = D_x f$ satisfies $\mu(J(x)) < 0$ for all values of $x$, then $\hat{x}$ is the only fixed point, and it is globally asymptotically stable.

This autonomous convergence theorem is very closely related to the Banach fixed-point theorem.

== How autonomous convergence works ==
Note: this is an intuitive description of how autonomous convergence theorems guarantee stability, not a strictly mathematical description.

The key point in the example theorem given above is the existence of a negative logarithmic norm, which is derived from a vector norm. The vector norm effectively measures the distance between points in the vector space on which the differential equation is defined, and the negative logarithmic norm means that distances between points, as measured by the corresponding vector norm, are decreasing with time under the action of $f$. So long as the trajectories of all points in the phase space are bounded, all trajectories must therefore eventually converge to the same point.

The autonomous convergence theorems by Russell Smith, Michael Li and James Muldowney work in a similar manner, but they rely on showing that the area of two-dimensional shapes in phase space decrease with time. This means that no periodic orbits can exist, as all closed loops must shrink to a point. If the system is bounded, then according to Pugh's closing lemma there can be no chaotic behaviour either, so all trajectories must eventually reach an equilibrium.

Michael Li has also developed an extended autonomous convergence theorem which is applicable to dynamical systems containing an invariant manifold.
