= Aizerman's conjecture =

In nonlinear control, Aizerman's conjecture or Aizerman problem states that a linear system in feedback with a sector nonlinearity would be stable if the linear system is stable for any linear gain of the sector. This conjecture, proposed by Mark Aronovich Aizerman in 1949, was proven false but led to the (valid) sufficient criteria on absolute stability.

== Mathematical statement of Aizerman's conjecture (Aizerman problem) ==
Consider a system with one scalar nonlinearity

$$\frac{dx}{dt}=Px+qf(e),\quad e=r^*x \quad x\in\mathbb R^n,$$

where P is a constant n×n-matrix, q, r are constant n-dimensional vectors, ∗ is an operation of transposition, f(e) is scalar function, and f(0)=0. Suppose that the nonlinearity f is sector bounded, meaning that for some real $k_1$ and $k_2$ with $k_1 <k_2$, the function $f$ satisfies

$$k_1  < \frac{f(e)}{e}< k_2, \quad \forall \; e \neq 0.$$

Then Aizerman's conjecture is that the system is stable in large (i.e. unique stationary point is global attractor) if all linear systems with f(e)=ke, k ∈(k1,k2) are asymptotically stable.

There are counterexamples to Aizerman's conjecture such that nonlinearity belongs to the sector of linear stability and unique stable equilibrium coexists with a stable periodic solution, i.e. a hidden oscillation. However, under stronger assumptions on the system, such as positivity, Aizerman's conjecture is known to hold true.

== Variants ==
- Strengthening of Aizerman's conjecture is Kalman's conjecture (or Kalman problem) where in place of condition on the nonlinearity it is required that the derivative of nonlinearity belongs to linear stability sector.
- A multivariate version of Aizerman's conjecture holds true over the complex field, and it can be used to derive the circle criterion for the stability of nonlinear time-varying systems.
