= Pugh's closing lemma =

Mathematical result in dynamical systems theory

In the mathematical field of dynamical systems theory, Pugh's closing lemma is a conjecture that would establish a close relationship between chaotic behavior and periodic behavior. Broadly, the lemma states that any point that is "nonwandering" within a system can be turned into a periodic (or repeating) point by making a very small, carefully chosen change to the system's rules.

This has significant implications. For example, it means that if a set of conditions on a bounded, continuous dynamical system rules out periodic orbits, that system cannot behave chaotically. This principle is the basis of some autonomous convergence theorems.

== Formal statement ==
Let $f:M \to M$ be a $C^1$ diffeomorphism of a compact smooth manifold $M$. Given a nonwandering point $x$ of $f$, there exists a diffeomorphism $g$ arbitrarily close to $f$ in the $C^1$ topology of $\operatorname{Diff}^1(M)$ such that $x$ is a periodic point of $g$.

== See also ==
- Smale's problems
