= Eveline Burgess =

American chess player (1856–1936)

Eveline Allen Burgess
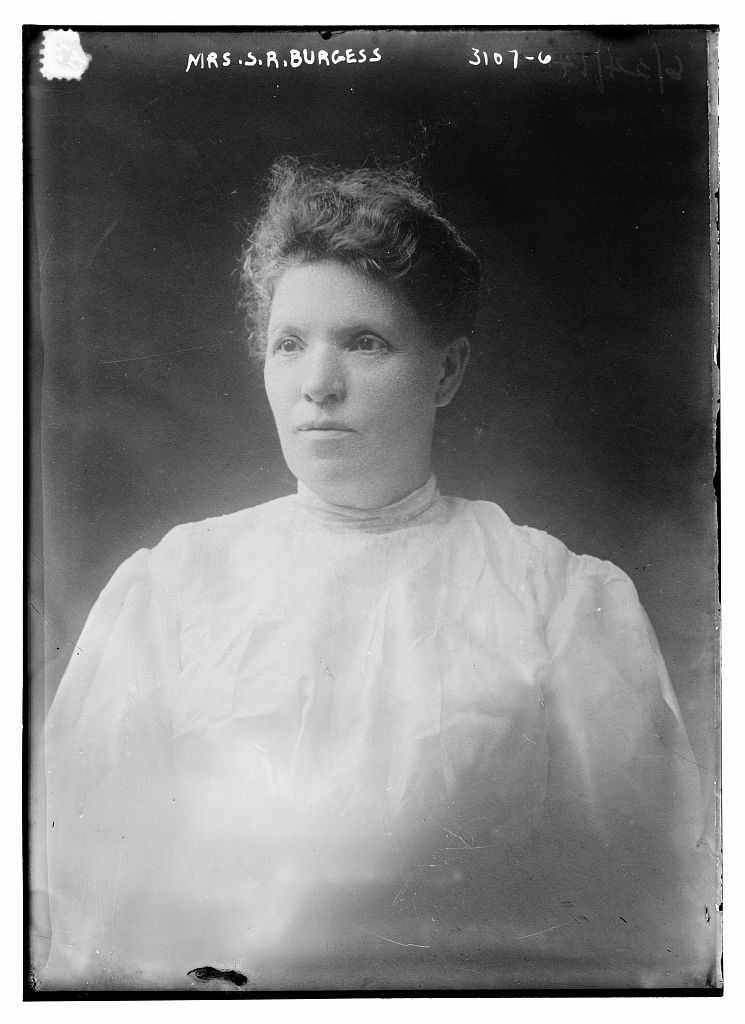
- Burgess circa 1915
- Born: Eveline Allen; September 19, 1856; Ogden, Utah, U.S.
- Died: July 10, 1936 (aged 79); Independence, Missouri, U.S.
- Known for: American women's chess champion
- Spouse: Samuel Rostron Burgess (1876-1918 (his death))

Eveline Allen Burgess (September 19, 1856 – July 10, 1936) was the American women's chess champion from 1907 to 1920.

== Early life ==
She was born as Eveline Allen on September 19, 1856, in Ogden, Utah to James T. Allen, and Elizabeth Pidd.

Her family moved to St. Joseph, Missouri, while she was an infant. Living there until she was ten years of age they moved to St. Louis, where she attended the Franklin and High schools, graduating from the latter in 1875 as valedictorian of her class.

== Career ==
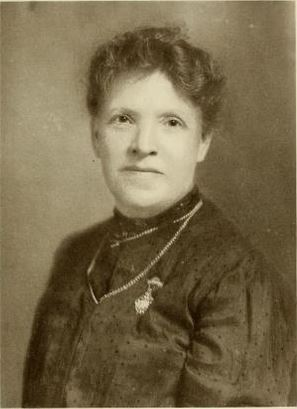
Eveline Burgess

Burgess did not remember when she began playing chess, having been, taught by her father, Dr. James X. Allen, an Englishman, from Lancashire, who was very fond of the game. He was a surgeon in the Union Army. Much of his leisure time was devoted to playing chess. He taught his little daughter and insisted that she play a game at noon hour while attending school, and she remembers frequently after finishing she would have to run all the way back to school to be on time. She became very enthusiastic and always played her best.

After she finished school, and until about twelve years after her marriage, she did not play chess, but when her brother, a lad of sixteen years, came to visit them he was very anxious to try his skill against her. While she felt that she did not "even remember the moves," she asked Mr. Burgess to bring home a set of chessmen from the book store, and the next day played seventeen games with her brother, losing only the first.

It was after her husband became interested that the different chess players in North St. Louis assembled and organized a club known as "The North St. Louis Chess Club." Burgess was the only woman member and played against five men, and often eight. She won the first prize three times, and the second once, in four tourneys; one of the prizes being a handsome shopping bag with gold mountings, beautifully engraved.

In 1901 a Woman's Chess Club was founded and held its meetings once each week at the rooms of the Office Men's Club on Washington Avenue. Mrs. Coldwell, a visitor from Canada, aided greatly in the organization, having been the first one to suggest this move. Miss Fitzgerald, daughter of Bishop Fitzgerald; Mrs. Woodward, wife of Professor Woodward; Mrs. Bouton, Miss Overall, daughter of Judge John Overall, and Mrs. S. B. Burgess were the members. A tourney was played in which Mrs. Burgess won first prize with a score of nine and one-half wins and one-half game lost. This club existed for one winter only.

The "West End" Chess Club was organized in 1907 at the home of W. F. Burden, 5029 Maple Avenue. The charter members were W. F. Burden, A. A. Hardy, E. F. Schrader, J. D. Bichardsons, J. G. Nix, P. B. Eversden and H. S. Frazer, M. D. Dr. Frazer was appointed secretary and held that office three years. The members number were about twenty. It was the courtesy of the club to elect Burgess and Mrs. Hewit alternately to the office of vice-president, they being the only active women members. Mr. S. B. Burgess was the president, Mrs. Hewit the vice-president, with Mr. Lee L. Backer as secretary. Mrs. Hewit ranked second to Burgess among the women players in St. Louis. She planned a brilliant game and never missed the Monday evening meetings of the West End Chess Club, at the Cabanne Branch Library. Mrs. J. H. Hewit was Eleanor Tomlinson, of Connecticut. Her father, like Burgess', was a surgeon in the army and taught her to play while she was a child. She was much admired and liked by the chess players for her charming personality and skillful game.

Eveline Burgess held the chess championship, among women in the United States, since March 1907, having won it from Mrs. Clarence Frey, then living in Newark, N. J., but a member of the Woman's Chess Club of New York. The match was played at the club headquarters of the Martha Washington Hotel in New York. For this victory Burgess was awarded a gold medal.

Soon after this she was challenged by Mrs. Natalie Nixdorff, of Cambridge, Mass., but did not make arrangements to play until the following year, when she was again the winner — four to one. Another and larger gold pin was presented her, with a shield, enameled in colors on a chess board surmounted by a crown.

After that Burgess was challenged by Mrs. Lynn, of Chicago, but at the time agreed upon Mrs. Lynn was unable to keep the appointment. Mrs. Nixdorff, being very anxious for another match, again challenged Mrs. Burgess, who accepted, but the game was indefinitely postponed.

== Personal life ==
She taught school and music for one year in Montgomery County, and on July 4, 1876, married Samuel Rostron Burgess (1851–1918), who was born in St. Louis and lived here all his life. Mr. Burgess was the secretary of the Boland Book Company until he retired.

She taught her grandson, Walter Richard Evans, to play chess.

Burgess had five children, who all play chess "a little," but only the oldest son, Samuel Allen, played a really good game, having won in simultaneous play against Pillsbury, while he was yet a student at Washington University. Not one of the children, however, were fond of chess, and only Mr. and Mrs. Burgess belong to the chess clubs.

She died on July 10, 1936, in Independence, Missouri.
