= Anatoliy Lure =

Soviet engineer and applied mathematician

Anatoliy Isakovich Lure
- Анатолий Исакович Лурье
- Born: July 19, 1901; Mogilev, Russian Empire
- Died: February 12, 1980 (aged 78); Leningrad, Soviet Union

Anatoliy Isakovich Lure (Russian: Анато́лий Иса́кович Лурье́, 19 July 1901 – 12 February 1980) was a Soviet engineer and applied mathematician, notable for his contributions to nonlinear control. He was a corresponding member of the USSR Academy of Sciences (1960).

== Biography ==
Anatoliy was born on July 19, 1901 in Mogilev, Mogilev province in the family of physician Isaac Anatolyevich Lure (1866-1946). He was the fifth child in the family.

In 1911 he entered the Mogilev Men's Gymnasium. After graduation he worked as a secretary in the Department of Public Education at the Mogilev District Executive Committee.

In 1920-1923 he studied at the Ural Mining Institute. In 1923-1925 he studied in Leningrad Polytechnic Institute.

In 1926 Anatoliy married to Berta Yakovlevna Granat.

In 1925-1941 he worked in Leningrad Polytechnic Institute.

In 1935 he was confirmed as a professor, in 1939 he was awarded the degree of Doctor of Technical Sciences.

In 1933-1941 – Professor of the Military Electrotechnical Academy named after S.M. Budyonny. In 1938-1941 – Professor of Leningrad State University.

1941-1944 – Head of the Department of Theoretical Mechanics at the Ural Industrial Institute named after S.M. Kirov.

1944-1977 – Head of the Department "Dynamics and Strength of Machines" of the Leningrad Polytechnic Institute.

In 1956 he joined the Initial composition of the USSR National Committee for Theoretical and Applied Mechanics.

In 1955-1960 he was Senior Researcher at the Institute of Electromechanics.

Lure died on February 12, 1980 in Leningrad. He was buried at the Komarovsky cemetery.

== Awards ==
Lure was awarded two Orders of the Red Banner of Labour, medals.
