= Walter R. Evans =

American control theorist (1920–1999)

- Born: January 15, 1920
- Died: July 10, 1999 (aged 79)
- Citizenship: American
- Education: University of California, Los Angeles; Washington University in St. Louis
- Known for: Root locus
- Awards: Rufus Oldenburger Medal (1987); Richard E. Bellman Control Heritage Award (1988)
- Scientific career
- Fields: Control theory

Walter Richard Evans (15 January 1920 – 10 July 1999) was a noted American control theorist and the inventor of the root locus method and the Spirule device in 1948. He was the recipient of the 1987 American Society of Mechanical Engineers Rufus Oldenburger Medal and the 1988 AACC's Richard E. Bellman Control Heritage Award.

== Biography ==
He was born on 15 January 1920, and received his B.E. in Electrical Engineering from Washington University in St. Louis in 1941 and his M.E. in Electrical Engineering from the University of California, Los Angeles in 1951.

Evans worked as an engineer at several companies, including General Electric, Rockwell International, and Ford Aeronautic Company.

He published a book named "Control System Dynamics" with McGraw-Hill in 1954.

He had four children. One of his children, Gregory Walter Evans, wrote an article about his father in the December 2004 issue of the IEEE Control Magazine.

Evans was taught to play chess by his grandmother, Eveline Allen Burgess, the American Women's Chess Champion from 1907 to 1920.
