= Markus–Yamabe conjecture =

In mathematics, the Markus–Yamabe conjecture is a conjecture on global asymptotic stability. If the Jacobian matrix of a dynamical system at a fixed point is Hurwitz, then the fixed point is asymptotically stable. Markus-Yamabe conjecture asks if a similar result holds globally. Precisely, the conjecture states that if a continuously differentiable map on an $n$-dimensional real vector space has a fixed point, and its Jacobian matrix is everywhere Hurwitz, then the fixed point is globally stable.

The conjecture is true for the two-dimensional case. However, counterexamples have been constructed in higher dimensions. Hence, in the two-dimensional case only, it can also be referred to as the Markus–Yamabe theorem.

Related mathematical results concerning global asymptotic stability, which are applicable in dimensions higher than two, include various autonomous convergence theorems. Analog of the conjecture for nonlinear control system with scalar nonlinearity is known as Kalman's conjecture.

== Mathematical statement of conjecture ==
Let $f:\mathbb{R}^n\rightarrow\mathbb{R}^n$ be a $C^1$ map with $f(0) = 0$ and Jacobian $Df(x)$ which is Hurwitz stable for every $x \in \mathbb{R}^n$.
Then $0$ is a global attractor of the dynamical system $\dot{x}= f(x)$.

The conjecture is true for $n=2$ and false in general for $n>2$.
