= Popov criterion =

In nonlinear control and stability theory, the Popov criterion is a stability criterion discovered by Vasile M. Popov for the absolute stability of a class of nonlinear systems whose nonlinearity must satisfy an open-sector condition. While the circle criterion can be applied to nonlinear time-varying systems, the Popov criterion is applicable only to autonomous (that is, time invariant) systems.

== System description ==
The sub-class of Lur'e systems studied by Popov is described by:

$$\begin{align}
\dot{x} & = Ax+bu \\
\dot{\xi} & = u  \\
y & = cx+d\xi
\end{align}$$

$$\begin{matrix} u = -\varphi (y) \end{matrix}$$

where x ∈ R^{n}, ξ,u,y are scalars, and A,b,c and d have commensurate dimensions. The nonlinear element Φ: R → R is a time-invariant nonlinearity belonging to open sector (0, ∞), that is, Φ(0) = 0 and yΦ(y) > 0 for all y not equal to 0.

Note that the system studied by Popov has a pole at the origin and there is no direct pass-through from input to output, and the transfer function from u to y is given by

$$H(s) = \frac{d}{s} + c(sI-A)^{-1}b$$

== Criterion ==
Consider the system described above and suppose

1. A is Hurwitz
2. (A,b) is controllable
3. (A,c) is observable
4. d > 0 and
5. Φ ∈ (0,∞)

then the system is globally asymptotically stable if there exists a number r > 0 such that $\inf_{\omega\,\in\,\mathbb R} \operatorname{Re} \left[ (1+j\omega r) H(j\omega)\right] > 0.$

== See also ==
- Circle criterion
