= Small control property =

For applied mathematics, in nonlinear control theory, a non-linear system of the form $\dot{x} = f(x,u)$ is said to satisfy the small control property if for every $\varepsilon > 0$ there exists a $\delta > 0$ so that for all $\|x\| < \delta$ there exists a $\|u\| < \varepsilon$ so that the time derivative of the system's Lyapunov function is negative definite at that point.

In other words, even if the control input is arbitrarily small, a starting configuration close enough to the origin of the system can be found that is asymptotically stabilizable by such an input.

== For Understanding ==
A system has:

- State x: where it currently is (position, speed, angle, etc.)
- Control u: what you can do to influence it (move your hand, adjust the motors, turn the wheel)

The equation $\dot{x}=f(x,u)$, just means “The way the system changes over time depends on its current state x and the control input u.”

A Lyapunov function applies in this instance in that it is like an energy or distance from the goal. The negative definite derivative means that everywhere except at the goal, the energy is decreasing, so the system is guaranteed to converge toward the equilibrium.

The small control property, in layman's terms, means that no matter how tiny a control input you’re willing to use, a neighborhood can be found around the equilibrium where that tiny control is still enough to stabilize the system.

== Example ==
Imagine balancing a pencil.

If the pencil is:

- perfectly upright → no control needed
- slightly tilted → tiny corrections work
- almost falling over → large corrections needed

The small control property says that if you start close enough to upright, then arbitrarily small corrections can still stabilize it.
