= Kalman's conjecture =

Disproved conjecture

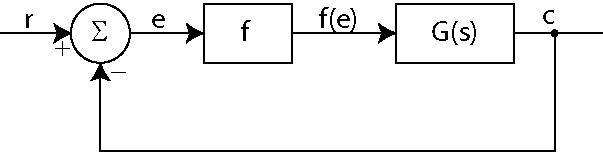
Fig. 1. Block scheme of control system. G(s) – linear transfer function, f(e) – single-valued, continuous, differentiable function

Kalman's conjecture or Kalman problem is a disproved conjecture on absolute stability of nonlinear control system with one scalar nonlinearity, which belongs to the sector of linear stability. Kalman's conjecture is a strengthening of Aizerman's conjecture and is a special case of Markus–Yamabe conjecture. This conjecture was proven false but led to the (valid) sufficient criteria on absolute stability.

== Mathematical statement of Kalman's conjecture (Kalman problem) ==
In 1957 R. E. Kalman in his paper stated the following:

If f(e) in Fig. 1 is replaced by constants K corresponding to all possible values of f'(e), and it is found that the closed-loop system is stable for all such K, then it intuitively clear that the system must be monostable; i.e., all transient solutions will converge to a unique, stable critical point.

Kalman's statement can be reformulated in the following conjecture:

Consider a system with one scalar nonlinearity

$$\frac{dx}{dt}=Px+qf(e),\quad e=r^*x \quad x\in R^n,$$

where P is a constant n×n matrix, q, r are constant n-dimensional vectors, ∗ is an operation of transposition, f(e) is scalar function, and f(0) = 0. Suppose, f(e) is a differentiable function and the following condition

$$k_1 < f'(e)< k_2. \,$$

is valid. Then Kalman's conjecture is that the system is stable in the large (i.e. a unique stationary point is a global attractor) if all linear systems with f(e) = ke, k ∈ (k_{1}, k_{2}) are asymptotically stable.

In Aizerman's conjecture in place of the condition on the derivative of nonlinearity it is required that the nonlinearity itself belongs to the linear sector.

Kalman's conjecture is true for n ≤ 3 and for n > 3 there are effective methods for construction of counterexamples: the nonlinearity derivative belongs to the sector of linear stability, and a unique stable equilibrium coexists with a stable periodic solution (hidden oscillation). In discrete-time, the Kalman conjecture is only true for n=1, counterexamples for n ≥ 2 can be constructed.

The development of Kalman's ideas on global stability based on the stability of linear approximation for a cylindrical phase space gave rise to the Viterbi problem on the coincidence of phase-locked loop ranges.
