= Circle criterion =

In nonlinear control and stability theory, the circle criterion is a stability criterion for nonlinear time-varying systems. It can be viewed as a generalization of the Nyquist stability criterion for linear time-invariant (LTI) systems.

== Overview ==
Consider a linear system subject to non-linear feedback, i.e., a nonlinear element $\varphi(v, t)$ is present in the feedback loop. Assume that the element satisfies a sector condition $[\mu_1,\mu_2]$, and (to keep things simple) that the open loop system is stable. Then the closed loop system is globally asymptotically stable if the Nyquist locus does not penetrate the circle having as diameter the segment $[-1/\mu_1,-1/\mu_2]$ located on the x-axis.

== General description ==
Consider the nonlinear system

$$\dot{\mathbf{x}} = \mathbf{Ax} + \mathbf{Bw},$$
$$\mathbf{v} = \mathbf{Cx},$$
$$\mathbf{w} = \varphi(v, t).$$

Suppose that

1. $\mu_1 v \le \varphi(v,t) \le \mu_2 v,\ \forall v,t$
2. $\det(i\omega I_n-A) \neq 0,\ \forall \omega \in R^{-1}\text{ and }\exists \mu_0 \in [\mu_1, \mu_2]\,:\, A+\mu_0 BC$ is stable
3. $\Re\left[(\mu_2 C(i\omega I_n-A)^{-1}B-1)(1-\mu_1C(i\omega I_n-A)^{-1}B)\right]<0 \ \forall \omega \in R^{-1}.$

Then $\exists c>0,\delta>0$ such that for any solution of the system, the following relation holds:

$$|x(t)| \le ce^{-\delta t}|x(0)|,\ \forall t \ge 0.$$

Condition 3 is also known as the frequency condition. Condition 1 is the sector condition.
