= Bode plot =

Graph of the frequency response of a control system

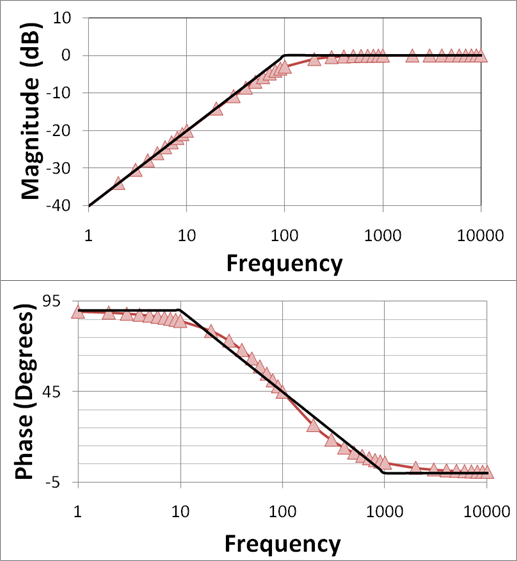
Figure 1A: High-pass filter (1st-order, one-pole) Bode magnitude plot (top) and Bode phase plot (bottom). The red data curve is approximated by the straight black line.

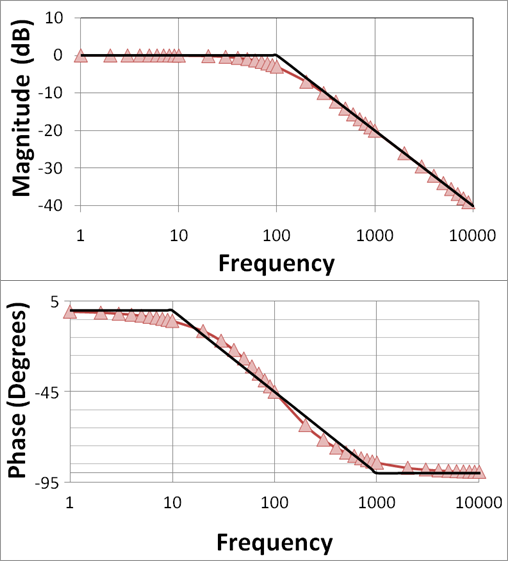
Figure 1B: Low-pass filter (1st-order, one-pole) Bode magnitude plot (top) and Bode phase plot (bottom). The red data curve is approximated by the straight black line.

In electrical engineering and control theory, a Bode plot is a graph of the frequency response of a system. It is usually a combination of a Bode magnitude plot, expressing the magnitude (usually in decibels) of the frequency response, and a Bode phase plot, expressing the phase shift.

As originally conceived by Hendrik Wade Bode in the 1930s, the plot is an asymptotic approximation of the frequency response, using straight line segments.

== Overview ==
Among his several important contributions to circuit theory and control theory, engineer Hendrik Wade Bode, while working at Bell Labs in the 1930s, devised a simple but accurate method for graphing gain and phase-shift plots. These bear his name, Bode gain plot and Bode phase plot. "Bode" is often pronounced in English as /ˈboʊdi/ BOH-dee, whereas in Dutch it is usually [ˈboːdə], closer to English /ˈboʊdə/ BOH-də, which is preferred by his family, but less common among researchers.

Bode was faced with the problem of designing stable amplifiers with feedback for use in telephone networks. He developed the graphical design technique of the Bode plots to show the gain margin and phase margin required to maintain stability under variations in circuit characteristics caused during manufacture or during operation. The principles developed were applied to design problems of servomechanisms and other feedback control systems. The Bode plot is an example of analysis in the frequency domain.

== Definition ==
The Bode plot for a linear, time-invariant system with transfer function $H(s)$ ($s$ being the complex frequency in the Laplace domain) consists of a magnitude plot and a phase plot.

The Bode magnitude plot is the graph of the function $|H(s=j \omega)|$ of frequency $\omega$ (with $j$ being the imaginary unit). The $\omega$-axis of the magnitude plot is logarithmic and the magnitude is given in decibels, i.e., a value for the magnitude $|H|$ is plotted on the axis at $20 \log_{10} |H|$.

The Bode phase plot is the graph of the phase, commonly expressed in degrees, of the argument function $\arg \left( H(s =j \omega) \right)$ as a function of $\omega$. The phase is plotted on the same logarithmic $\omega$-axis as the magnitude plot, but the value for the phase is plotted on a linear vertical axis.

== Frequency response ==
This section illustrates that a Bode plot is a visualization of the frequency response of a system.

Consider a linear, time-invariant system with transfer function $H(s)$. Assume that the system is subject to a sinusoidal input with frequency $\omega$,

$$u(t) = \sin (\omega t),$$

that is applied persistently, i.e. from a time $-\infty$ to a time $t$. The response will be of the form

$$y(t) = y_0 \sin (\omega t + \varphi),$$

i.e., also a sinusoidal signal with amplitude $y_0$ shifted by a phase $\varphi$ with respect to the input.

It can be shown that the magnitude of the response is

$y_0 = |H(\mathrm{j} \omega)|$	1

and that the phase shift is

$\varphi = \arg H(\mathrm{j} \omega).$	2

In summary, subjected to an input with frequency $\omega$, the system responds at the same frequency with an output that is amplified by a factor $|H(\mathrm{j} \omega)|$ and phase-shifted by $\arg H(\mathrm{j} \omega)$. These quantities, thus, characterize the frequency response and are shown in the Bode plot.

== Rules for handmade Bode plot ==
For many practical problems, the detailed Bode plots can be approximated with straight-line segments that are asymptotes of the precise response. The effect of each of the terms of a multiple element transfer function can be approximated by a set of straight lines on a Bode plot. This allows a graphical solution of the overall frequency response function. Before widespread availability of digital computers, graphical methods were extensively used to reduce the need for tedious calculation; a graphical solution could be used to identify feasible ranges of parameters for a new design.

The premise of a Bode plot is that one can consider the log of a function in the form

$$f(x) = A \prod (x - c_n)^{a_n}$$

as a sum of the logs of its zeros and poles:

$$\log(f(x)) = \log(A) + \sum a_n \log(x - c_n).$$

This idea is used explicitly in the method for drawing phase diagrams. The method for drawing amplitude plots implicitly uses this idea, but since the log of the amplitude of each pole or zero always starts at zero and only has one asymptote change (the straight lines), the method can be simplified.

=== Straight-line amplitude plot ===
Amplitude decibels is usually done using $\text{dB} = 20 \log_{10}(X)$ to define decibels. Given a transfer function in the form

$$H(s) = A \prod \frac{(s - x_n)^{a_n}}{(s - y_n)^{b_n}},$$

where $x_n$ and $y_n$ are constants, $s = \mathrm{j}\omega$, $a_n, b_n > 0$, and $H$ is the transfer function:

- At every value of s where $\omega = x_n$ (a zero), increase the slope of the line by $20 a_n\ \text{dB}$ per decade.
- At every value of s where $\omega = y_n$ (a pole), decrease the slope of the line by $20 b_n\ \text{dB}$ per decade.
- The initial value of the graph depends on the boundaries. The initial point is found by putting the initial angular frequency $\omega$ into the function and finding $|H(\mathrm{j}\omega)|$.
- The initial slope of the function at the initial value depends on the number and order of zeros and poles that are at values below the initial value, and is found using the first two rules.

To handle irreducible 2nd-order polynomials, $ax^2 + bx + c$ can, in many cases, be approximated as $(\sqrt{a}x + \sqrt{c})^2$.

Note that zeros and poles happen when $\omega$ is equal to a certain $x_n$ or $y_n$. This is because the function in question is the magnitude of $H(\mathrm{j}\omega)$, and since it is a complex function, $|H(\mathrm{j}\omega)| = \sqrt{H \cdot H^*}$. Thus at any place where there is a zero or pole involving the term $(s + x_n)$, the magnitude of that term is $\sqrt{(x_n + \mathrm{j}\omega)(x_n - \mathrm{j}\omega)} = \sqrt{x_n^2 + \omega^2}$.

=== Corrected amplitude plot ===
To correct a straight-line amplitude plot:

- At every zero, put a point $3 a_n\ \text{dB}$ above the line.
- At every pole, put a point $3 b_n\ \text{dB}$ below the line.
- Draw a smooth curve through those points using the straight lines as asymptotes (lines which the curve approaches).

Note that this correction method does not incorporate how to handle complex values of $x_n$ or $y_n$. In the case of an irreducible polynomial, the best way to correct the plot is to actually calculate the magnitude of the transfer function at the pole or zero corresponding to the irreducible polynomial, and put that dot over or under the line at that pole or zero.

=== Straight-line phase plot ===
Given a transfer function in the same form as above,

$$H(s) = A \prod \frac{(s - x_n)^{a_n}}{(s - y_n)^{b_n}},$$

the idea is to draw separate plots for each pole and zero, then add them up. The actual phase curve is given by

$$\varphi(s) = -\arctan \frac{\operatorname{Im}[H(s)]}{\operatorname{Re}[H(s)]}.$$

To draw the phase plot, for each pole and zero:

- If $A$ is positive, start line (with zero slope) at 0°.
- If $A$ is negative, start line (with zero slope) at −180°.
- If the sum of the number of unstable zeros and poles is odd, add 180° to that basis.
- At every $\omega = |x_n|$ (for stable zeros $-\operatorname{Re}(z) < 0$), increase the slope by $45 a_n$ degrees per decade, beginning one decade before $\omega = |x_n|$ (e.g., $|x_n|/10$).
- At every $\omega = |y_n|$ (for stable poles $-\operatorname{Re}(p) < 0$), decrease the slope by $45 b_n$ degrees per decade, beginning one decade before $\omega = |y_n|$ (e.g., $|y_n|/10$).
- "Unstable" (right half-plane) poles and zeros ($\operatorname{Re}(s) > 0$) have opposite behavior.
- Flatten the slope again when the phase has changed by $90 a_n$ degrees (for a zero) or $90 b_n$ degrees (for a pole).
- After plotting one line for each pole or zero, add the lines together to obtain the final phase plot; that is, the final phase plot is the superposition of each earlier phase plot.

== Example ==
To create a straight-line plot for a first-order (one-pole) low-pass filter, one considers the normalized form of the transfer function in terms of the angular frequency:

$$H_{\text{lp}}(\mathrm{j} \omega) = \frac{1}{1 + \mathrm{j} \frac{\omega}{\omega_\text{c}}}.$$

The Bode plot is shown in Figure 1(b) above, and construction of the straight-line approximation is discussed next.

=== Magnitude plot ===
The magnitude (in decibels) of the transfer function above (normalized and converted to angular-frequency form), given by the decibel gain expression $A_\text{vdB}$:

$$\begin{align}
A_\text{vdB} &= 20 \log|H_{\text{lp}}(\mathrm{j}\omega)| \\
&= 20 \log \frac{1}{\left| 1 + \mathrm{j} \frac{\omega}{\omega_\text{c}} \right|} \\
&= -20 \log \left| 1 + \mathrm{j} \frac{\omega}{\omega_\text{c}} \right| \\
&= -10 \log \left( 1 + \frac{\omega^2}{\omega_\text{c}^2} \right).
\end{align}$$

Then plotted versus input frequency $\omega$ on a logarithmic scale, can be approximated by two lines, forming the asymptotic (approximate) magnitude Bode plot of the transfer function:

- The first line for angular frequencies below $\omega_\text{c}$ is a horizontal line at 0 dB, since at low frequencies the $\omega/\omega_\text{c}$ term is small and can be neglected, making the decibel gain equation above equal to zero.
- The second line for angular frequencies above $\omega_\text{c}$ is a line with a slope of −20 dB per decade, since at high frequencies the $\omega/\omega_\text{c}$ term dominates, and the decibel gain expression above simplifies to $-20 \log(\omega/\omega_\text{c})$, which is a straight line with a slope of −20 dB per decade.

These two lines meet at the corner frequency $\omega_\text{c}$. From the plot, it can be seen that for frequencies well below the corner frequency, the circuit has an attenuation of 0 dB, corresponding to a unity pass-band gain, i.e. the amplitude of the filter output equals the amplitude of the input. Frequencies above the corner frequency are attenuated – the higher the frequency, the higher the attenuation.

=== Phase plot ===
The phase Bode plot is obtained by plotting the phase angle of the transfer function given by

$$\arg H_{\text{lp}}(\mathrm{j} \omega) = -\tan^{-1}\frac{\omega}{\omega_\text{c}}$$

versus $\omega$, where $\omega$ and $\omega_\text{c}$ are the input and cutoff angular frequencies respectively. For input frequencies much lower than corner, the ratio $\omega/\omega_\text{c}$ is small, and therefore the phase angle is close to zero. As the ratio increases, the absolute value of the phase increases and becomes −45° when $\omega = \omega_\text{c}$. As the ratio increases for input frequencies much greater than the corner frequency, the phase angle asymptotically approaches −90°. The frequency scale for the phase plot is logarithmic.

=== Normalized plot ===
The horizontal frequency axis, in both the magnitude and phase plots, can be replaced by the normalized (nondimensional) frequency ratio $\omega/\omega_\text{c}$. In such a case the plot is said to be normalized, and units of the frequencies are no longer used, since all input frequencies are now expressed as multiples of the cutoff frequency $\omega_\text{c}$.

== An example with zero and pole ==
Figures 2–5 further illustrate construction of Bode plots. This example with both a pole and a zero shows how to use superposition. To begin, the components are presented separately.

Figure 2 shows the Bode magnitude plot for a zero and a low-pass pole, and compares the two with the Bode straight line plots. The straight-line plots are horizontal up to the pole (zero) location and then drop (rise) at 20 dB/decade. The second Figure 3 does the same for the phase. The phase plots are horizontal up to a frequency factor of ten below the pole (zero) location and then drop (rise) at 45°/decade until the frequency is ten times higher than the pole (zero) location. The plots then are again horizontal at higher frequencies at a final, total phase change of 90°.

Figure 4 and Figure 5 show how superposition (simple addition) of a pole and zero plot is done. The Bode straight line plots again are compared with the exact plots. The zero has been moved to higher frequency than the pole to make a more interesting example. Notice in Figure 4 that the 20 dB/decade drop of the pole is arrested by the 20 dB/decade rise of the zero resulting in a horizontal magnitude plot for frequencies above the zero location. Notice in Figure 5 in the phase plot that the straight-line approximation is pretty approximate in the region where both pole and zero affect the phase. Notice also in Figure 5 that the range of frequencies where the phase changes in the straight line plot is limited to frequencies a factor of ten above and below the pole (zero) location. Where the phase of the pole and the zero both are present, the straight-line phase plot is horizontal because the 45°/decade drop of the pole is arrested by the overlapping 45°/decade rise of the zero in the limited range of frequencies where both are active contributors to the phase.

Example with pole and zero

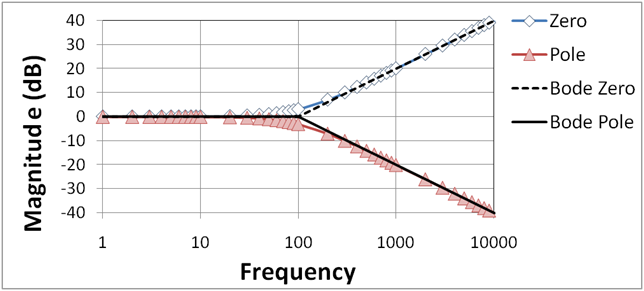
Figure 2: Bode magnitude plot for zero and low-pass pole; curves labeled "Bode" are the straight-line Bode plots

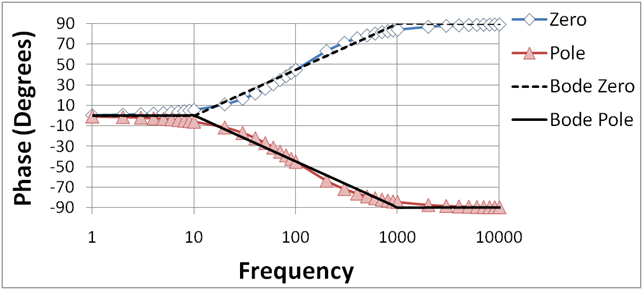
Figure 3: Bode phase plot for zero and low-pass pole; curves labeled "Bode" are the straight-line Bode plots

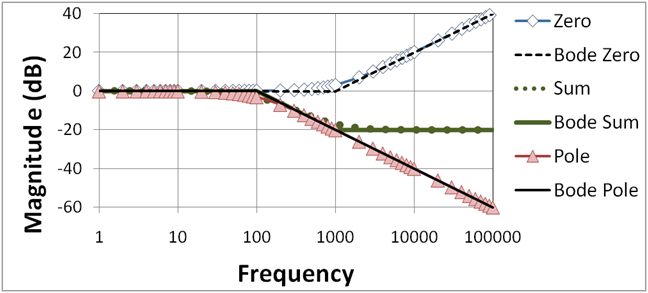
Figure 4: Bode magnitude plot for pole-zero combination; the location of the zero is ten times higher than in Figures 2 and 3; curves labeled "Bode" are the straight-line Bode plots

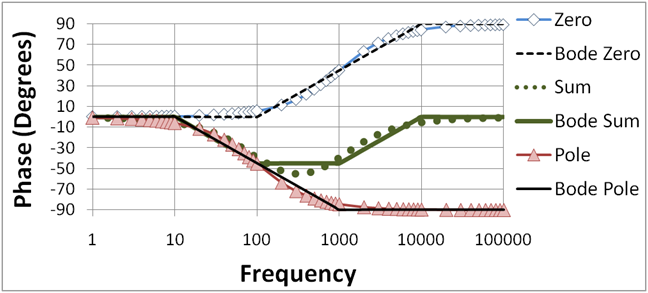
Figure 5: Bode phase plot for pole-zero combination; the location of the zero is ten times higher than in Figures 2 and 3; curves labeled "Bode" are the straight-line Bode plots

== Gain margin and phase margin ==
Bode plots are used to assess the stability of negative-feedback amplifiers by finding the gain and phase margins of an amplifier. The notion of gain and phase margin is based upon the gain expression for a negative feedback amplifier given by

$$A_\text{FB} = \frac{A_\text{OL}}{1 + \beta A_\text{OL}},$$

where A_{FB} is the gain of the amplifier with feedback (the closed-loop gain), β is the feedback factor, and A_{OL} is the gain without feedback (the open-loop gain). The gain A_{OL} is a complex function of frequency, with both magnitude and phase. (Note: Ordinarily, as frequency increases, the magnitude of the gain drops, and the phase becomes more negative, although these are only trends and may be reversed in particular frequency ranges. Unusual gain behavior can render the concepts of gain and phase margin inapplicable. Then other methods such as the Nyquist plot have to be used to assess stability.) Examination of this relation shows the possibility of infinite gain (interpreted as instability) if the product βA_{OL} = −1 (that is, the magnitude of βA_{OL} is unity and its phase is −180°, the so-called Barkhausen stability criterion). Bode plots are used to determine just how close an amplifier comes to satisfying this condition.

Key to this determination are two frequencies. The first, labeled here as f_{180}, is the frequency where the open-loop gain flips sign. The second, labeled here f_{0 dB}, is the frequency where the magnitude of the product |βA_{OL}| = 1 = 0 dB. That is, frequency f_{180} is determined by the condition

$$\beta A_\text{OL}(f_{180}) = -|\beta A_\text{OL}(f_{180})| = -|\beta A_\text{OL}|_{180},$$

where vertical bars denote the magnitude of a complex number, and frequency f_{0 dB} is determined by the condition

$$|\beta A_\text{OL}(f_\text{0 dB})| = 1.$$

One measure of proximity to instability is the gain margin. The Bode phase plot locates the frequency where the phase of βA_{OL} reaches −180°, denoted here as frequency f_{180}. Using this frequency, the Bode magnitude plot finds the magnitude of βA_{OL}. If |βA_{OL}|_{180} ≥ 1, the amplifier is unstable, as mentioned. If |βA_{OL}|_{180} < 1, instability does not occur, and the separation in dB of the magnitude of |βA_{OL}|_{180} from |βA_{OL}| = 1 is called the gain margin. Because a magnitude of 1 is 0 dB, the gain margin is simply one of the equivalent forms: $20 \log_{10} |\beta A_\text{OL}|_{180} = 20 \log_{10} |A_\text{OL}| - 20 \log_{10} \beta^{-1}$.

Another equivalent measure of proximity to instability is the phase margin. The Bode magnitude plot locates the frequency where the magnitude of |βA_{OL}| reaches unity, denoted here as frequency f_{0 dB}. Using this frequency, the Bode phase plot finds the phase of βA_{OL}. If the phase of βA_{OL}(f_{0 dB}) > −180°, the instability condition cannot be met at any frequency (because its magnitude is going to be < 1 when f = f_{180}), and the distance of the phase at f_{0 dB} in degrees above −180° is called the phase margin.

If a simple yes or no on the stability issue is all that is needed, the amplifier is stable if f_{0 dB} < f_{180}. This criterion is sufficient to predict stability only for amplifiers satisfying some restrictions on their pole and zero positions (minimum phase systems). Although these restrictions usually are met, if they are not, then another method must be used, such as the Nyquist plot. Optimal gain and phase margins may be computed using Nevanlinna–Pick interpolation theory.

=== Examples using Bode plots ===
Figures 6 and 7 illustrate the gain behavior and terminology. For a three-pole amplifier, Figure 6 compares the Bode plot for the gain without feedback (the open-loop gain) A_{OL} with the gain with feedback A_{FB} (the closed-loop gain). See negative feedback amplifier for more detail.

In this example, A_{OL} = 100 dB at low frequencies, and 1 / β = 58 dB. At low frequencies, A_{FB} ≈ 58 dB as well.

Because the open-loop gain A_{OL} is plotted and not the product β A_{OL}, the condition A_{OL} = 1 / β decides f_{0 dB}. The feedback gain at low frequencies and for large A_{OL} is A_{FB} ≈ 1 / β (look at the formula for the feedback gain at the beginning of this section for the case of large gain A_{OL}), so an equivalent way to find f_{0 dB} is to look where the feedback gain intersects the open-loop gain. (Frequency f_{0 dB} is needed later to find the phase margin.)

Near this crossover of the two gains at f_{0 dB}, the Barkhausen criteria are almost satisfied in this example, and the feedback amplifier exhibits a massive peak in gain (it would be infinity if β A_{OL} = −1). Beyond the unity gain frequency f_{0 dB}, the open-loop gain is sufficiently small that A_{FB} ≈ A_{OL} (examine the formula at the beginning of this section for the case of small A_{OL}).

Figure 7 shows the corresponding phase comparison: the phase of the feedback amplifier is nearly zero out to the frequency f_{180} where the open-loop gain has a phase of −180°. In this vicinity, the phase of the feedback amplifier plunges abruptly downward to become almost the same as the phase of the open-loop amplifier. (Recall, A_{FB} ≈ A_{OL} for small A_{OL}.)

Comparing the labeled points in Figure 6 and Figure 7, it is seen that the unity gain frequency f_{0 dB} and the phase-flip frequency f_{180} are very nearly equal in this amplifier, f_{180} ≈ f_{0 dB} ≈ 3.332 kHz, which means the gain margin and phase margin are nearly zero. The amplifier is borderline stable.

Figures 8 and 9 illustrate the gain margin and phase margin for a different amount of feedback β. The feedback factor is chosen smaller than in Figure 6 or 7, moving the condition | β A_{OL} | = 1 to lower frequency. In this example, 1 / β = 77 dB, and at low frequencies A_{FB} ≈ 77 dB as well.

Figure 8 shows the gain plot. From Figure 8, the intersection of 1 / β and A_{OL} occurs at f_{0 dB} = 1 kHz. Notice that the peak in the gain A_{FB} near f_{0 dB} is almost gone. (Note: The critical amount of feedback where the peak in the gain just disappears altogether is the maximally flat or Butterworth design.)

Figure 9 is the phase plot. Using the value of f_{0 dB} = 1 kHz found above from the magnitude plot of Figure 8, the open-loop phase at f_{0 dB} is −135°, which is a phase margin of 45° above −180°.

Using Figure 9, for a phase of −180° the value of f_{180} = 3.332 kHz (the same result as found earlier, of course (Note: The frequency where the open-loop gain flips sign f_{180} does not change with a change in feedback factor; it is a property of the open-loop gain. The value of the gain at f_{180} also does not change with a change in β. Therefore, we could use the previous values from Figures 6 and 7. However, for clarity the procedure is described using only Figures 8 and 9.)). The open-loop gain from Figure 8 at f_{180} is 58 dB, and 1 / β = 77 dB, so the gain margin is 19 dB.

Stability is not the sole criterion for amplifier response, and in many applications a more stringent demand than stability is good step response. As a rule of thumb, good step response requires a phase margin of at least 45°, and often a margin of over 70° is advocated, particularly where component variation due to manufacturing tolerances is an issue. See also the discussion of phase margin in the step response article.

Examples

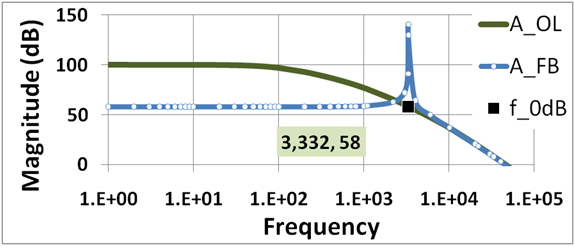
Figure 6: Gain of feedback amplifier A_{FB} in dB and corresponding open-loop amplifier A_{OL}. Parameter 1/β = 58 dB, and at low frequencies A_{FB} ≈ 58 dB as well. The gain margin in this amplifier is nearly zero because | βA_{OL}| = 1 occurs at almost f = f_{180°}.

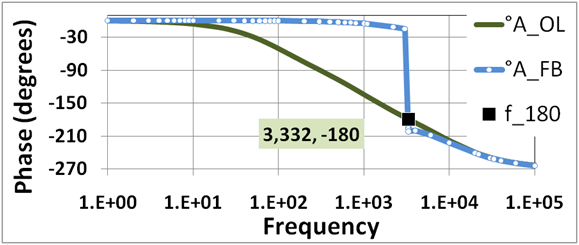
Figure 7: Phase of feedback amplifier °A_{FB} in degrees and corresponding open-loop amplifier °A_{OL}. The phase margin in this amplifier is nearly zero because the phase-flip occurs at almost the unity gain frequency f = f_{0 dB} where | βA_{OL}| = 1.

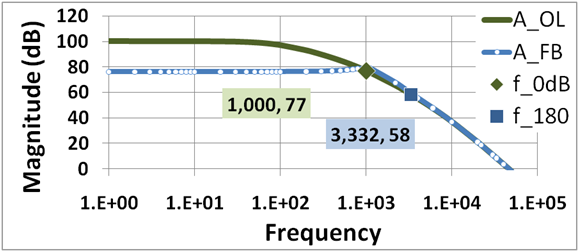
Figure 8: Gain of feedback amplifier A_{FB} in dB and corresponding open-loop amplifier A_{OL}. In this example, 1 / β = 77 dB. The gain margin in this amplifier is 19 dB.

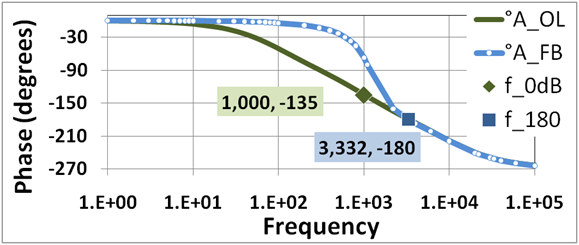
Figure 9: Phase of feedback amplifier A_{FB} in degrees and corresponding open-loop amplifier A_{OL}. The phase margin in this amplifier is 45°.

== Bode plotter ==
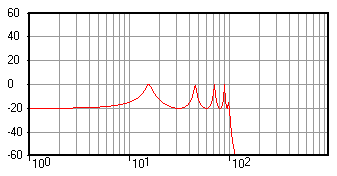
Figure 10: Amplitude diagram of a 10th-order electronic filter plotted using a Bode plotter

The Bode plotter is an electronic instrument resembling an oscilloscope, which produces a Bode diagram, or a graph, of a circuit's voltage gain or phase shift plotted against frequency in a feedback control system or a filter. An example of this is shown in Figure 10. It is extremely useful for analyzing and testing filters and the stability of feedback control systems, through the measurement of corner (cutoff) frequencies and gain and phase margins.

This is identical to the function performed by a vector network analyzer, but the network analyzer is typically used at much higher frequencies.

For education and research purposes, plotting Bode diagrams for given transfer functions facilitates better understanding and getting faster results (see external links).

== Related plots ==
Two related plots that display the same data in different coordinate systems are the Nyquist plot and the Nichols plot. These are parametric plots, with frequency as the input and magnitude and phase of the frequency response as the output. The Nyquist plot displays these in polar coordinates, with magnitude mapping to radius and phase to argument (angle). The Nichols plot displays these in rectangular coordinates, on the log scale.

Figure 11: A Nyquist plot.

Figure 12: A Nichols plot of the same response from Figure 11.

== See also ==
- Analog signal processing
- Phase margin
- Bode's sensitivity integral
- Bode's magnitude (gain)–phase relation
- Dielectric spectroscopy
