= Closed-loop transfer function =

Function describing the effects of feedback on a control system

In control theory, a closed-loop transfer function is a mathematical function describing the net result of the effects of a feedback control loop on the input signal to the plant under control.

== Overview ==
The closed-loop transfer function is measured at the output. The output signal can be calculated from the closed-loop transfer function and the input signal. Signals may be waveforms, images, or other types of data streams.

An example of a closed-loop block diagram, from which a transfer function may be computed, is shown below:

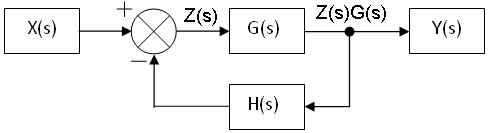

The summing node and the G(s) and H(s) blocks can all be combined into one block, which would have the following transfer function:

$$\dfrac{Y(s)}{X(s)} = \dfrac{G(s)}{1 + G(s) H(s)}$$

$G(s)$ is called the feed forward transfer function, $H(s)$ is called the feedback transfer function, and their product $G(s)H(s)$ is called the open-loop transfer function.

== Derivation ==
We define an intermediate signal Z (also known as error signal) shown as follows:

Using this figure we write:

$$Y(s) = G(s)Z(s)$$

$$Z(s) =X(s)-H(s)Y(s)$$

Now, plug the second equation into the first to eliminate Z(s):

$$Y(s) = G(s)[X(s)-H(s)Y(s)]$$

Move all the terms with Y(s) to the left hand side, and keep the term with X(s) on the right hand side:

$$Y(s)+G(s)H(s)Y(s) = G(s)X(s)$$

Therefore,

$$Y(s)(1+G(s)H(s)) = G(s)X(s)$$

$$\Rightarrow \dfrac{Y(s)}{X(s)} = \dfrac{G(s)}{1+G(s)H(s)}$$

== See also ==
- Federal Standard 1037C
- Open-loop controller
- Control theory § Open-loop and closed-loop (feedback) control
