= Christopher I. Byrnes =

American electrical engineer (1950–2010)

- Born: Christopher Ian Byrnes; June 28, 1949; The Bronx, New York, United States
- Died: February 7, 2010 (aged 60); Stockholm, Sweden
- Known for: Nonlinear control; robust control
- Awards: George Axelby Prize; W. T. and Idalia Reid Prize; Hendrik W. Bode Lecture Prize

Academic background
- Education: Manhattan College (BS); University of Massachusetts Amherst (MS, PhD)
- Thesis: On the algebraic foundations of differential geometry (1975)
- Doctoral advisor: Marshall H. Stone

Academic work
- Institutions: Harvard University; Arizona State University; University of Utah; Washington University in St. Louis; Royal Institute of Technology
- Main interests: Control theory; Distributed parameter systems; differential geometry; stochastic control

Christopher Ian Byrnes (June 28, 1949 – February 7, 2010) was an American mathematician and control theorist. He was the Edward H. and Florence G. Skinner Professor Emeritus of Systems Science and Mathematics at Washington University in St. Louis and served as dean of the School of Engineering & Applied Science from 1991 to 2006.

Byrnes made foundational contributions to nonlinear control, output regulation, distributed parameter systems, and geometric methods in control theory. Together with Tryphon T. Georgiou and Anders Lindquist, Byrnes was a founder of the so-called Byrnes–Georgiou–Lindquist school, which developed a new moment-based approach for the solution of control and estimation problems with complexity constraints.

== Early life and education ==
Byrnes was born in New York City in 1950 and raised in the Bronx. He earned a Bachelor of Science degree in mathematics from Manhattan College in 1971. As a freshman, he encountered his first computer and briefly worked as an economic forecaster for the United Nations, troubleshooting computer code. He declined a permanent position to continue his studies.

He attended the University of Massachusetts, Amherst, where he studied differential geometry under Marshall H. Stone. He earned a Master of Science degree in 1973 and a doctorate in mathematics in 1975 with a dissertation on the algebraic foundations of differential geometry.

== Career ==
Byrnes began his academic career as an instructor of mathematics at the University of Utah in 1975. He joined Harvard University in 1978 as an assistant professor and attained tenure as an associate professor in 1983. He later taught at Arizona State University, where he founded the Center for Systems Engineering Research. In 1989, he joined Washington University in St. Louis as professor of systems and control, and later served as chair of the Department of Systems Science and Control.

On July 15, 1991, Byrnes became the eighth dean of the School of Engineering & Applied Science at Washington University. During his tenure, the school's endowment grew from $54 million to $185 million, and endowed professorships increased from nine to 37. He oversaw the founding of the Department of Biomedical Engineering, the Institute of Biological and Medical Engineering, and the implementation of Project 21, a strategic planning initiative at the university.

His research spanned systems science, control theory, and applied mathematics, with major contributions in nonlinear control, output regulation, distributed parameter systems, and the geometric and algebraic foundations of control. In the late 1970s and 1980s, he developed the nonlinear regulator equations and extended output regulation theory to nonlinear and distributed systems, including boundary control and partial differential equations. He contributed to the generalized servomechanism problem, zero dynamics, and root locus methods for infinite-dimensional systems.

He collaborated extensively with researchers including Alberto Isidori, Anders Lindquist, and Tryphon T. Georgiou, with whom he established the so-called Byrnes–Georgiou–Lindquist school. Their research developed moment-based methods for control and estimation under complexity constraints used widely in the field. His work also impacted Kalman filtering, robust control, pole placement, multivariable Nyquist–Shannon sampling theorem, and generalized moment problems. Applications include signal processing, electric power systems, and speech synthesis.

At the time of his death in 2010, Byrnes was a distinguished visiting professor in optimization and systems theory at the Royal Institute of Technology in Stockholm, Sweden. He had previously held visiting and adjunct appointments at the institute from 1985 to 1991 and 2001.

== Awards ==
- Honorary Doctor of Technology, Royal Institute of Technology, 1998
- Foreign Member, Royal Swedish Academy of Engineering Sciences, 2001
- Fellow, Institute of Electrical and Electronics Engineers (IEEE)
- IEEE George Axelby Prize (twice)
- W. T. and Idalia Reid Prize, 2005
- IEEE Hendrik W. Bode Lecture Prize, 2008
