= Lindqvist =

Lindqvist is a surname of Swedish origin. It means "linden twig", as lind means "linden tree" (Tilia cordata) and kvist means "twig".

Variations include Lindkvist, Lindquist, Lindhqvist, Lindqwist, and Lindkuist.

== People ==
- Anders Lindquist, Swedish mathematician
- Carl-Johan Lindqvist, Swedish luger who competed in the early 1990s
- Catarina Lindqvist, Swedish professional tennis player
- Cecilia Lindqvist (1932–2021), Swedish Sinologist
- Ebba Lindqvist (1908–1995), Swedish writer and poet
- Elin Lindqvist (born 1982), Swedish novelist
- Einar Lindqvist (1895–1972), Swedish ice hockey player who competed in the 1920 Summer Olympics
- Emma Lindqvist, Swedish handballer
- Erik Lindqvist (1886–1934), Swedish sailor who competed in the 1912 Summer Olympics
- Frans Wilhelm Lindqvist (1862–1931), Swedish inventor
- Hélène Lindqvist, Swedish-born soprano
- Herman Lindqvist (politician), Swedish Social Democratic politician
- Herman Lindqvist (journalist), Swedish journalist
- Jenny Lindqvist, Swedish ice hockey player
- Johan Anton Lindqvist, theatre director
- John Ajvide Lindqvist, Swedish novelist and short stories author
- Robin Lindqvist, professional Swedish ice hockey center
- Sven Lindqvist (1932–2019), Swedish author
- Sven Lindqvist (footballer) (1903–1987), Swedish soccer player who competed in the 1924 Summer Olympics

== In other fields ==
- Bodil Lindqvist v Åklagarkammaren i Jönköping is a 2003 decision by the European Court of Justice stating that online publication of personal details constitutes processing of personal data.
- Fåhræus–Lindqvist effect is an effect where the viscosity of a fluid, namely blood, changes.

== See also ==
- Lindquist
