= Lindquist (disambiguation) =

Lindquist is a surname.

Lindquist may also refer to:

- Lindquist Apartment House, an apartment complex located in northeast Portland, Oregon, United States, listed on the National Register of Historic Places
- Lindquist Field, a stadium in Ogden, Utah, United States
- Lindquist Island, part of the North Barnard Islands, Australia
- Lindquist Lake, a freshwater lake in northeastern Wisconsin, United States
