= Tryphon T. Georgiou =

Greek-American electrical engineer

- Born: October 18, 1956 (age 70); Athens, Greece
- Known for: Large-gain theorem; gap metric; robust control

Academic background
- Education: National Technical University of Athens (BS); University of Florida (PhD)
- Thesis: Partial realization of covariance sequences (1985)
- Doctoral advisor: Rudolf Emil Kalman

Academic work
- Institutions: University of California, Irvine; University of Minnesota
- Main interests: Control theory; separation principle; relaxation oscillator; stochastic control; linear–quadratic–Gaussian control

Tryphon Thomas Georgiou (/ˈɡiːɔːrdʒuː/, Greek: Τρύφων Θωμάς Γεωργίου pronounced [ˈtrifon θoˈmas ʝeorˈʝiu]; born 18 October 1956) is a Greek and American electrical engineer and applied mathematician. He has made contributions to control theory and dynamical systems. Since 2016, he has been a distinguished professor of mechanical and aerospace engineering at the University of California, Irvine (UCI).

== Early life and education ==
Georgiou was born in Athens in 1956. He earned a diploma in Mechanical and Electrical Engineering from the National Technical University of Athens in 1979 and a doctorate in electrical engineering from the University of Florida in 1983. He was advised by Rudolf E. Kálmán and wrote a dissertation on covariance sequences in stochastic control.

== Career ==
After completing his doctorate, Georgiou joined the faculty of Florida Atlantic University in 1983 and Iowa State University in 1986. He joined the University of Minnesota in 1989, where he was professor for nearly three decades and director of the Control Science and Dynamical Systems Center beginning in 1990. He also served as Vincentine Hermes-Luh Chair in Electrical and Computer Engineering from 2002 to 2016.

His research specializes in control theory, with an emphasis on stochastic and robust control. He made contributions to the development of the gap metric for measuring distances between dynamical systems and analyzing feedback robustness, including extensions to nonlinear systems. In 1997, he developed the large-gain theorem, providing quantitative conditions for stability in both linear and nonlinear settings, and worked on the separation principle in stochastic control. Along with Malcolm C. Smith, Christopher I. Byrnes, and Anders Lindquist, Georgiou also works on stochastic control problems, including state covariance steering and Linear-quadratic-Gaussian control. He has also made contributions to network models for disease spread in epidemiology, market fragility in financial systems, and neural connectivity in the brain.

In 2016, he became a distinguished professor at the Samueli School of Engineering at UC Irvine. He has been on the board of governors for the IEEE since 2002. He is a fellow of the International Federation of Automatic Control (IFAC) since 2016 and the Society for Industrial and Applied Mathematics (SIAM) since 2021.

== Awards ==
- Fellow – American Association for the Advancement of Science (2023)
- Foreign Member – Royal Swedish Academy of Engineering Sciences (2011)
- Fellow – Institute of Electrical and Electronics Engineers (2000)
