= Eckhard Platen =

German/Australian mathematician, financial economist

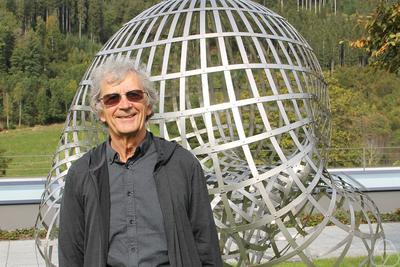
- Platen at Oberwolfach in 2023
- Born: 1949 (age 76–77)
- Occupations: Mathematician, financial economist, academic and author

Academic background
- Education: MSc., Mathematics; PhD., Probability Theory; DSc, Science
- Alma mater: Technical University Dresden; Academy of Sciences Berlin

Academic work
- Institutions: University of Technology Sydney

Eckhard Platen is a German/Australian mathematician, financial economist, academic, and author. He is an emeritus Professor of Quantitative Finance at the University of Technology Sydney.

Platen is most known for his research on numerical methods for stochastic differential equations and their application in finance along with the generalization of the classical mathematical finance theory by his benchmark approach. He has authored and co-authored research papers and five books including Numerical Solution of Stochastic Differential Equations, A Benchmark Approach to Quantitative Finance and Functionals of Multi-dimensional Diffusions with Applications to Finance. He is the recipient of the 1992 Best Paper Award in Mathematical Finance, was named Honorary Professor at the University of Cape Town from 2014 to 2019 and at the Australian National University from 2015 to 2020, and is a Fellow of the Australian Mathematical Society.

== Education ==
Platen earned an MSc in Mathematics in 1972 and a PhD in Probability Theory in 1975 from the Technical University Dresden, followed by a DSc in Science at the Academy of Sciences, Berlin in 1985.

== Career ==
Platen began his academic career in 1975 as a Research Fellow at the Weierstrass Institute at the Academy of Sciences Berlin, holding the position of Head of the Sector Stochastics from 1987 to 1990. Later, in 1991, he assumed the role of Senior Fellow at the Institute of Advanced Studies at the Australian National University in Canberra, serving as the Founding Head of the Centre for Financial Mathematics from 1994 to 1997. In 1997, he took on a joint appointment between the School of Finance and Economics and the School of Mathematical Sciences, and as the chair in Quantitative Finance at the University of Technology Sydney. He remained a Research Director of the Quantitative Finance Research Centre at the University of Technology Sydney from 1998 until 2021 and has held the position of emeritus Professor of Quantitative Finance since 2021.

Platen founded the Quantitative Methods in Finance annual conference series in 1993, where he served as chair for 25 years. Later, he became President of the Bachelier Finance Society from 2014 to 2015 and has been a Director of the Scientific Association of Mathematical Finance since 2021.

== Research ==
Platen has contributed to the field of mathematics and financial economics by studying numerical methods and quantitative finance and proposing the benchmark approach for finance, insurance and economics.

== Works ==
Platen has authored and co-authored five books on numerical methods and quantitative finance. Earlier, he focused on the numerical solution of stochastic differential equations, writing three books on the topic including Numerical Solution of Stochastic Differential Equations with Peter Kloeden, Numerical Solution of SDE Through Computer Experiments with Kloeden and Henri Schurz, and Numerical Solution of Stochastic Differential Equations with Jumps in Finance with Nicola Bruti-Liberati. About the first book, Francesco Gianfelici remarked, "...the need for proper SDE methodologies in a numerical context is increasingly pressing and provides the motivation and the starting point of this excellent book written by Kloeden and Platen."

Later, Platen published monographs on his benchmark approach, namely A Benchmark Approach to Quantitative Finance with David Heath. In a review for Quantitative Finance, Wolfgang Runggaldier commented "The book thus presents itself as a comprehensive treatment of Quantitative Finance and distinguishes itself from analogous treatments by using a novel approach, namely the benchmark approach." He also co-wrote the book Functionals of Multi-dimensional Diffusions with Applications to Finance with Jan Baldeaux, which explored the systemic derivation of explicit formulas for functionals of diffusions.

=== Numerical solution of stochastic differential equations ===
Platen's work on stochastic differential equations has focused on a general theory for their numerical solution. He contended that the availability of a stochastic analogue to the deterministic Taylor formula would be essential for a numerical theory for stochastic differential equations. Together with Wagner, he discovered the stochastic Taylor formula, and then developed systematically a theory for the efficient numerical solution of stochastic differential equations. With various co-authors, he made seminal contributions on numerical stability, and stochastic delay equations.

=== The Wagner–Platen Expansion for SDEs with Jumps ===
Eckhard Platen extended his seminal work on the stochastic Taylor expansion commonly known as the Wagner–Platen expansion to encompass stochastic differential equations (SDEs) with jumps, thereby broadening its applicability across a wider class of stochastic processes relevant in financial and scientific modeling.

The Wagner–Platen expansion for SDEs with jumps is a stochastic generalization of the classical Taylor series. It facilitates the expansion of increments of smooth functions of Itô processes using multiple stochastic integrals, including both continuous and jump components. This is especially powerful for constructing high-order numerical methods for SDEs that incorporate Lévy jumps, which are common in models of financial markets, insurance, and queuing systems.

Similar to the deterministic Taylor formula, the Wagner–Platen expansion enables the local approximation of stochastic processes around a point in time and state variables to any desired level of accuracy. The expansion expresses changes of a function of time and state variables over a small time interval in terms of a sum of multiple stochastic integrals involving derivatives of the function, Brownian motion integrals, time integrals, and compensated Poisson integrals for jump components.

This expansion was first introduced by Wagner & Platen (1978) and was further refined in a series of foundational works, including Platen (1982b), Platen & Wagner (1982), and the influential monograph Kloeden & Platen (1992).

The Wagner-Platen expansion provides the foundation of the numerical theory for stochastic differential equations, where it became truncated in appropriate ways to provide discrete-time approximations for solutions of stochastic differential equations, including the Euler-Maruyama scheme, the Milstein scheme, and higher-order strong or weak schemes.

=== Benchmark approach ===
Platen is the originator of the benchmark approach, a foundational alternative to classical mathematical finance. Developed over decades, his theory replaces the traditional risk-neutral paradigm with a real-world pricing framework centered on the growth optimal portfolio (GOP). In his recent papers, Platen consolidates key results and applies the theory to long-term financial instruments, notably extreme-maturity zero-coupon bonds and European options.

Platen first questioned classical pricing through early work on option pricing under stochastic volatility, observing that risk-neutral prices for long-term contracts were systematically overpriced. This led him to formulate a model using the GOP—also known as the Kelly portfolio or numéraire portfolio as the central unit of value. The GOP, which maximizes expected logarithmic utility, replaces the risk-free asset as numéraire and defines pricing under the real-world probability measure.

Platen shows that real-world pricing, which employs the GOP as the numéraire and the real-world probability measure as pricing measure, yields the lowest theoretically justifiable value for replicable contingent claims especially useful for valuing long-term contracts like pensions and insurance.

Recognizing that the true GOP is difficult to implement due to high leverage, Platen introduced benchmark-neutral (BN) pricing in his 2024 work. This practical extension uses a well-diversified stock portfolio (excluding the savings account) as the numéraire. When the BN pricing measure is equivalent to the real-world one, BN prices match real-world prices.

Platen applies the drifted time-transformed squared Bessel process of dimension four a key tool from his Minimal Market Model (MMM)—to approximate the GOP. His empirical results demonstrate that BN prices for extreme-maturity derivatives are significantly lower than their risk-neutral counterparts and can be accurately hedged, implying major cost savings in long-term finance.

Platen further grounds the benchmark approach in a broader scientific framework, involving information theory and using tools such as Li symmetry groups, information minimization, and Noether-type conservation laws.

The benchmark approach rests on two minimal assumptions: (1) the existence of the GOP, and (2) the minimization of the joint information of the risk-neutral pricing measure. The first assumption is less restrictive than those underpinning classical finance, notably avoiding the NFLVR condition. Instead, the first assumption is equivalent to the No Unbounded Profit with Bounded Risk (NUPBR) condition by Karatzas and Kardaras. Platen argues, these two axioms allow much of financial market behavior to be derived, elevating finance to a discipline with predictive and explanatory depth comparable to the natural sciences.

== Awards and honors ==
- 2014 – Honorary Professor, University of Cape Town
- 2015 – Honorary Professor, Australian National University

== Bibliography ==
=== Books ===
- Numerical Solution of Stochastic Differential Equations (1992) ISBN 978-3540540625
- Numerical Solution of SDE Through Computer Experiments (1994) ISBN 978-3540570745
- Numerical Solution of Stochastic Differential Equations with Jumps in Finance (2010) ISBN 978-3642120572
- A Benchmark Approach to Quantitative Finance (2006) ISBN 978-3540262121
- Functionals of Multi-dimensional Diffusions with Applications to Finance (2013) ISBN 978-3319007465

=== Selected articles ===
- Platen, E. & Wagner W. (1982) On a Taylor formula for a class of Ito processes. Probability and Mathematical Statistics, 3 (1), 37–51.
- Hofmann, N., Platen, E. & Schweizer, M. (1992). Option pricing under incompleteness and stochastic volatility. Mathematical Finance, 2 (3), 153–187.
- Milstein, G.N., Platen, E. & Schurz, H. (1998). Balanced implicit methods for stiff stochastic systems. SIAM Journal on Numerical Analysis, 35 (3), 1010–1019.
- Platen, E. & Schweizer, M. (1998). On feedback effects from hedging derivatives. Mathematical Finance, 8 (1), 67–84.
- Platen, E. (1999). An introduction to numerical methods for stochastic differential equations. Acta Numerica, 8, 197–246.
- Küchler, U. & Platen, E. (2000). Strong discrete time approximation of stochastic differential equations with time delay. Mathematics and Computers in Simulation, 54, 189–205.
- Platen, E. (2002). Arbitrage in continuous complete markets. Advances in Applied Probability, 33 (2), 540–558.
- Craddock, M. & Platen, E. (2004). Symmetry group methods for fundamental solutions. Journal of Differential Equations, 207 (2), 285–302.
- Platen, E. (2006). A benchmark approach to finance. Mathematical Finance, 16 (1), 131–151.
- Filipovic, D. & Platen, E. (2009). Consistent market extensions under the benchmark approach. Mathematical Finance, 19 (1), 41–52.
- Du, K. & Platen, E. (2016). Benchmarked risk minimization. Mathematical Finance. doi: 10.1111/mafi.12065
- Baldeaux, J. & Ignatieva, K. & Platen, E. (2017). Detecting money market bubbles. Journal of Banking & Finance. 87, 369–379.
- Fergusson, K. & Platen, E. (2023). Less-expensive long-term annuities linked to mortality, cash and equity. Annals of Actuarial Science. 17, 170–207.
