= Carl Lindquist =

Carl Lindquist may refer to:

- Carl Lindquist (baseball) (1919–2001), pitcher in Major League Baseball
- Carl Lindquist (actor) (born 1988), Swedish actor and singer
- Carl Lindquist (judge), Chief Justice of the Montana Supreme Court
- Carl G. Lindquist (1896–1993), dairy farmer and legislator in Michigan
