= Lindquist =

Lindquist, a variation of Lindqvist. Notable people with the surname include:

- Anders Lindquist (born 1942), Swedish applied mathematician and control theorist
- Barbara Lindquist (born 1969), American triathlete
- Bosse Lindquist (born 1954), Swedish radio and TV producer and writer
- Carl Lindquist (disambiguation)
- Cynthia Lindquist, American academic administrator
- Ed Lindquist (born 1938), former American politician in the Oregon House of Representatives
- Emory Lindquist (1908–1992), professor and author of books on Swedish-American history
- Evan Lindquist (born 1936), artist and printmaker, artist laureate for Arkansas 2013–2017
- Everett Franklin Lindquist (1901–1978), American professor of education at the University of Iowa
- Francis O. Lindquist (1869–1924), American politician from Michigan
- Greg Lindquist (born 1979), American artist
- Håkan Lindquist (1958–2022), Swedish writer
- H. L. Lindquist (1884–1978), early 20th century editor and publisher of philatelic books
- Jack Lindquist (1927–2016), American child actor, president of the Disneyland amusement park in Anaheim, California
- Johan Lindquist (died 1779), Swedish clock and watch maker
- Leonard E. Lindquist (1912–2004), American lawyer and politician from Minnesota
- Marita Lindquist (1918–2016), Finnish author of children's books and lyricist
- Mark Lindquist (born 1949), American wood-sculptor
- Marty Lindquist (born 1969), American cruiserweight professional boxer from Minnesota
- Mel Lindquist (1911–2000), American sculptor
- Roy E. Lindquist (1907–1986), Commander in the United States Army
- Sture Lindquist (1910–1978), Swedish chess master
- Susan Lindquist (1949–2016), American scientist
- Vic Lindquist (1908–1983), Canadian ice hockey player

== See also ==
- Albert Lindquest (1891–1984), Swedish-American voice teacher, also known as Allan Rogers Lindquest
