= Xiaoying Han =

Chinese mathematician

- Education: University of Science and Technology of China (BE, 2001); University at Buffalo (MA, 2004); University at Buffalo (PhD, 2007)
- Scientific career
- Fields: Mathematics
- Institutions: Auburn University
- Thesis: Interlayer Mixing in Thin Film Growth (2007)
- Doctoral advisor: Brian John Spencer
- Website: webhome.auburn.edu/~xzh0003/

Xiaoying (Maggie) Han is a Chinese mathematician whose research concerns random dynamical systems, stochastic differential equations, and actuarial science. She was the Marguerite Scharnagle Endowed Professor in Mathematics at Auburn University from 2018 until 2020.

== Education and career ==
Han graduated from the University of Science and Technology of China in 2001. She completed her Ph.D. in 2007 at the University at Buffalo. Her dissertation, Interlayer Mixing in Thin Film Growth, was supervised by Brian J. Spencer. She joined the Auburn faculty in 2007. She was promoted to full professor in 2017. She was given the Marguerite Scharnagle Endowed Professorship in 2018, which she held until 2020. Han was named a Fulbright Scholar in 2020, but the Fulbright program shut down during the COVID-19 pandemic, and she was unable to use it for the planned trip to Brazil.

In 2022, Han was appointed acting deputy associate dean for Academic Affairs in the College of Sciences and Mathematics at Auburn. In 2023, Han became the permanent associate dean for Academic Affairs.

== Awards and honors ==
In 2015, Han was awarded the 2015–2017 Jack B. Brown Endowed Faculty Award.

== Books ==
Han is the co-author of three books:

- Applied Nonautonomous and Random Dynamical Systems (with T. Caraballo, Springer, 2016)
- Attractors Under Discretisation (with P. E. Kloeden, Springer, 2017)
- Random Ordinary Differential Equations and Their Numerical Solution (with P. E. Kloeden, Springer, 2017)
