= Giorgio Picci =

Italian electrical engineer and control theorist

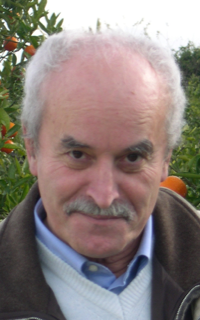
- Picci in around 2022
- Born: 26 May 1942; Vittorio Veneto (TV), Italy
- Died: 11 March 2026 (aged 83); Padua (PD), Italy
- Education: University of Padua (Dr. Eng. in 1967) www.dei.unipd.it/~picci/
- Awards: Fellow of the IEEE (1994); Foreign member of the Royal Swedish Academy of Engineering Sciences (IVA) (2004); Fellow of the International Federation of Automatic Control (IFAC) (2009); Member of the Galilean Academy of Sciences, Letters and Arts in Padova (2024)
- Scientific career
- Fields: Electrical Engineering and Control Theory
- Workplaces: University of Padua (retired in 2012)

Giorgio Picci (26 May 1942 – 11 March 2026) was an Italian electrical engineer and control theorist. He made widely recognized contributions to the field of Systems and Control, and in particular, to the areas of Stochastic Realization and System Identification. He had also been a pioneer in Computer Vision. He published a monograph (in English) and nearly 200 papers in these areas.

He was a Professor Emeritus with the Department of Information Engineering, University of Padua, Italy. He was also the Italian director of the Confucius Institute at the University of Padua, where he actively promoted cultural and scientific exchanges between China and Italy, in collaborations with Guangzhou University in China.

== Biography ==
Picci obtained the Doctor in Engineering (Dr. Eng.) degree (summa cum laude) from the University of Padua in 1967. From 1980 to 2012, he was the Chair Professor in System Identification at the Department of Information Engineering, University of Padua. During his career, he had a number of visiting positions with different universities on three continents, namely North America (the United States), Europe (the Netherlands, Austria, and Sweden), and Asia (Japan and China).

Picci was a Fellow of the IEEE, a foreign member of the Royal Swedish Academy of Engineering Sciences, a Fellow of the International Federation of Automatic Control, and a member of the Galilean Academy of Sciences, Letters and Arts in Padua.

Picci died on the morning of 11 March 2026, at the age of 83.

== Selected publications ==
Monograph:

- Lindquist, A., & Picci, G. (2015). Series in Contemporary Mathematics: vol. 1, Linear Stochastic Systems: A Geometric Approach to Modeling, Estimation and Identification. Springer-Verlag, Berlin Heidelberg. This book was translated into Chinese and published in two volumes by the Shanghai Scientific and Technical Publishers in 2018.

Textbooks:

- Picci, G. (2024). An Introduction to Statistical Data Science: Theory and Models. Springer, Cham.
- Picci, G. (2007). Filtraggio Statistico (Wiener, Levinson, Kalman) e Applicazioni (in Italian). Progetto Libreria, Padua.

Edited books:

- Picci, G. & Valcher, M. E. eds. (2007). A Tribute to Antonio Lepschy. Libreria Progetto, Padua.
- Picci, Giorgio; Gilliam, David S., eds. (1999). Dynamical Systems, Control, Coding, Computer Vision. doi:10.1007/978-3-0348-8970-4. ISBN 978-3-0348-9848-5.
- Beghi, A., Finesso, L., & Picci, G. eds. (1998). Mathematical Theory of Networks and Systems: Proceedings of the MTNS-98 Symposium Held in Padova, Italy, July, 1998, Il Poligrafo, Padua.
- Bittanti, S. & Picci, G. eds. (1996). NATO ASI Subseries F: vol. 153, Identification, Adaptation, Learning: The Science of Learning Models from Data. Springer-Verlag, Berlin Heidelberg.

Recent papers:

- Leahu, Timofei; Picci, Giorgio (2025). An Empirical Bayes Approach to ARX Estimation (Preprint). arXiv:2505.13384.
- Picci, Giorgio (2025). On Irreversibility and Stochastic Systems; Part One (Preprint). arXiv:2508.08330.
- Picci, Giorgio (2024). On Irreversibility and Stochastic Systems; Part Two (Preprint). arXiv:2411.01516.
- Cao, Wenqi; Lindquist, Anders; Picci, Giorgio (December 2023). "Modeling of Low Rank Time Series". IEEE Transactions on Automatic Control. 68 (12): 7270–7285. arXiv:2109.11814. Bibcode:2023ITAC...68.7270C. doi:10.1109/TAC.2023.3321370.
- Cao, Wenqi; Picci, Giorgio; Lindquist, Anders (May 2023). "Identification of low rank vector processes". Automatica. 151 110938. arXiv:2111.10899. doi:10.1016/j.automatica.2023.110938.
- Picci, Giorgio (April 2023). "Periodic vector processes with an internal Reciprocal Dynamics". Systems & Control Letters. 174 105503. doi:10.1016/j.sysconle.2023.105503.
- Picci, Giorgio; Falconi, Lucia; Ferrante, Augusto; Zorzi, Mattia (March 2023). "Hidden factor estimation in Dynamic Generalized Factor Analysis models". Automatica. 149 110834. arXiv:2211.12789. doi:10.1016/j.automatica.2022.110834.
- Picci, Giorgio; Zhu, Bin (August 2022). "Empirical Bayes identification of stationary processes and approximation of Toeplitz spectra". Automatica. 142 110362. doi:10.1016/j.automatica.2022.110362.
