= Witsenhausen's counterexample =

Witsenhausen's counterexample, shown in the figure below, is a deceptively simple toy problem in decentralized stochastic control. It was formulated by Hans Witsenhausen in 1968. It is a counterexample to a natural conjecture that one can generalize a key result of centralized linear–quadratic–Gaussian control systems—that in a system with linear dynamics, Gaussian disturbance, and quadratic cost, affine (linear) control laws are optimal—to decentralized systems. Witsenhausen constructed a two-stage linear quadratic Gaussian system where two decisions are made by decision makers with decentralized information and showed that for this system, there exist nonlinear control laws that outperform all linear laws. The problem of finding the optimal control law remains unsolved.

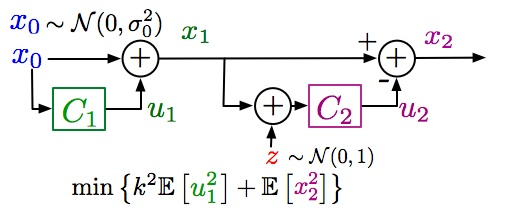

== Statement of the counterexample ==
The statement of the counterexample is simple: two controllers attempt to control the system by attempting to bring the state close to zero in exactly two time steps. The first controller observes the initial state $x_0.$ There is a cost on the input $u_1$ of the first controller, and a cost on the state $x_2$ after the input of the second controller. The input $u_2$ of the second controller is free, but it is based on noisy observations $y_1=x_1+z$ of the state $x_1$ after the first controller's input. The second controller cannot communicate with the first controller and thus cannot observe either the original state $x_0$ or the input $u_1$ of the first controller. Thus the system dynamics are

$$x_1=x_0+u_1,$$
$$x_2=x_1-u_2,$$

with the second controller's observation equation

$$y_1=x_1+z.$$

The objective is to minimize an expected cost function,

$$k^2E[u_1^2]+E[x_2^2],$$

where the expectation is taken over the randomness in the initial state $x_0$ and the observation noise $z$, which are distributed independently. The observation noise $z$ is assumed to be distributed in a Gaussian manner, while the distribution of the initial state value $x_0$ differs depending on the particular version of the problem.

The problem is to find control functions

$$u_1(x_0) \quad \text{and} \quad u_2(y_1)$$

that give at least as good a value of the objective function as do any other pair of control functions. Witsenhausen showed that the optimal functions $u_1(x_0)$ and $u_2(y_1)$ cannot be linear.

== Specific results of Witsenhausen ==
Witsenhausen obtained the following results:

- An optimum exists (Theorem 1).
- The optimal control law of the first controller is such that $E(x_1)=0$ (Lemma 9).
- The exact solution is given for the case in which both controllers are constrained to be linear (Lemma 11).
- If $x_0$ has a Gaussian distribution and if at least one of the controllers is constrained to be linear, then it is optimal for both controllers to be linear (Lemma 13).
- The exact nonlinear control laws are given for the case in which $x_0$ has a two-point symmetric distribution (Lemma 15).
- If $x_0$ has a Gaussian distribution, for some values of the preference parameter $k$ a non-optimal nonlinear solution for the control laws is given which gives a lower value for the expected cost function than does the best linear pair of control laws (Theorem 2).

== The significance of the problem ==
The counterexample lies at the intersection of control theory and information theory. Due to its hardness, the problem of finding the optimal control law has also received attention from the theoretical computer science community. The importance of the problem was reflected upon in the 47th IEEE Conference on Decision and Control (CDC) 2008, Cancun, Mexico, where an entire session was dedicated to understanding the counterexample 40 years after it was first formulated.

The problem is of conceptual significance in decentralized control because it shows that it is important for the controllers to communicate with each other implicitly in order to minimize the cost. This suggests that control actions in decentralized control may have a dual role: those of control and communication.

== The hardness of the problem ==
The hardness of the problem is attributed to the fact that information of the second controller depends on the decisions of the first controller. Variations considered by Tamer Basar show that the hardness is also because of the structure of the performance index and the coupling of different decision variables. It has also been shown that problems of the spirit of Witsenhausen's counterexample become simpler if the transmission delay along an external channel that connects the controllers is smaller than the propagation delay in the problem. However, this result requires the channels to be perfect and instantaneous, and hence is of limited applicability. In practical situations, the channel is always imperfect, and thus one can not assume that decentralized control problems are simple in presence of external channels.

A justification of the failure of attempts that discretize the problem came from the computer science literature: Christos Papadimitriou and John Tsitsiklis showed that the discrete version of the counterexample is NP-complete.

== Attempts at obtaining a solution ==
A number of numerical attempts have been made to solve the counterexample. Focusing on a particular choice of problem parameters $(k=0.2,\;\sigma_0=5)$, researchers have obtained strategies by discretization and using neural networks. Further research (notably, the work of Yu-Chi Ho, and the work of Li, Marden and Shamma) has obtained slightly improved costs for the same parameter choice. The best known numerical results for a variety of parameters, including the one mentioned previously, are obtained by a local search algorithm proposed by S.-H. Tseng and A. Tang in 2017. The first provably approximately optimal strategies appeared in 2010 (Grover, Park, Sahai) where information theory is used to understand the communication in the counterexample. The optimal solution of the counterexample is still an open problem.
