= Hans Witsenhausen =

American control theorist (1930-2016)

- Born: May 30, 1930; Frankfurt am Main, Germany
- Died: November 19, 2016 (aged 86); New York City, US
- Known for: Witsenhausen counterexample

Academic background
- Education: Université libre de Bruxelles; MIT
- Thesis: Minimax control of uncertain systems (1966)
- Doctoral advisor: Michael Athans

Hans Sylvain Witsenhausen (6 May 1930 – 19 November 2016) is notable for his work in the fields of control theory and information theory, and their intersection. He has many foundational results including the intrinsic model in stochastic decentralized control, the Witsenhausen counterexample. his work on Turán graph, and the various notions of common information in information theory.

== Education and career ==
Witsenhausen received the I.C.M.E. degree in electrical engineering in 1953 and the degree of Licence en Sciences in mathematical physics in 1956, both from the Université libre de Bruxelles in Brussels, Belgium. He received the S.M. and Ph.D. degrees in electrical engineering from the Massachusetts Institute of Technology in 1964 and 1966, respectively. His doctoral thesis advisor was Michael Athans. From 1957 to 1959, Witsenhausen was engaged in problem analysis and programming at the European Computation Center in Brussels. From 1960 to 1963, he was a Senior Engineer at the Research and Computation Division of Electronic Associates, inc. in Princeton, New Jersey, where he worked on analog and hybrid computer techniques and on systems analysis problems. From 1963 to 1965, he was associated with the Electronic Systems Laboratory and the Lincoln Laboratory at MIT. From 1965 to 1966, he was a fellow of the Fannie and John Hertz Foundation.

In 1966, Witsenhausen joined the AT&T Bell Labs, where he spent most of the remaining time of his career. In 1972, he was a senior fellow at the Imperial College London. From 1975 to 1976, he was also a Vinton Hayes Senior Fellow at Harvard University.
