= Peter Kloeden =

Australian-born German mathematician (born 1949)

Peter Eris Kloeden
- Born: January 12, 1949 (age 77); Ringwood, Victoria, Australia
- Occupations: Mathematician, academic and author
- Awards: W. T. and Idalia Reid Prize (2006); Fellow, SIAM (2009)

Academic background
- Education: BA (Hons), Mathematics; PhD, Mathematics; DSc
- Alma mater: Macquarie University; University of Queensland
- Thesis: On General Semi-Dynamical Systems (1975)
- Doctoral advisor: Rudolf Výborný

Academic work
- Discipline: Mathematics
- Sub-discipline: Dynamical systems, stochastic analysis, numerical analysis
- Institutions: Murdoch University; Goethe University Frankfurt

Peter Eris Kloeden (born 12 January 1949) is an Australian-born German mathematician specializing in dynamical systems, stochastic analysis, and numerical analysis. He is known for his contributions to the theory of nonautonomous and random dynamical systems, particularly the development of pullback attractors, and for co-authoring a foundational text on the numerical solution of stochastic differential equations. He is a Fellow of the Society for Industrial and Applied Mathematics (SIAM) and a recipient of the W. T. and Idalia Reid Prize.

== Early life and education ==
Kloeden was born in Ringwood, Victoria, Australia. He earned a Bachelor of Arts in Mathematics with first-class honours from Macquarie University in 1972. He completed his PhD in mathematics at the University of Queensland in 1975 under the supervision of Rudolf Výborný, with a thesis titled On General Semi-Dynamical Systems. He was later awarded a Doctor of Science (DSc) degree, also from the University of Queensland, in 1995.

== Career ==
Kloeden held academic positions in Australia from the mid 1970s to the mid 1990s, including appointments at Monash University and Murdoch University, where he became associate professor in 1984. He was appointed full professor at Deakin University in 1992.

In 1997 he moved to Germany, initially as deputy leader of the Stochastic Algorithms research group at the Weierstrass Institute for Applied Analysis and Stochastics in Berlin. Later that year he was appointed Chair of Applied and Instrumental Mathematics at Goethe University Frankfurt, a position he held until his retirement in 2014. Since then, he has held visiting or affiliated positions at Huazhong University of Science and Technology in China (as a "Thousand Talents Plan" distinguished professor), Auburn University in the United States, and the University of Tübingen in Germany.

=== Editorial and service contributions ===
Kloeden served as Co-Editor-in-Chief of Discrete & Continuous Dynamical Systems, Series B from 2012 to 2022 and has held associate editor positions for many other journals, including the SIAM Journal on Numerical Analysis and Stochastics & Dynamics. He has supervised numerous masters and PhD students and collaborated with scholars from Australia, Brazil, China, Hungary, Germany, Greece, Israel, Japan, Moldova, Poland, Russia, Spain, UK, USA and Vietnam.

== Research ==
Kloeden's research spans pure and applied analysis, probability, and numerical analysis, with a focus on differential equations and dynamical systems. As of July 2026 Kloeden has an h-index of 72 on Google Scholar.

=== Stochastic numerics ===
Together with Eckhard Platen, Kloeden authored Numerical Solution of Stochastic Differential Equations (Springer, 1992). The book is widely cited as a seminal reference in the numerical analysis of stochastic processes and has been influential in areas such as computational finance.

=== Nonautonomous and random dynamical systems ===
Kloeden has made contributions to the theory of systems driven by time-dependent or random forces. He played a key role in developing the concept of pullback attractors, which describe the long-term behaviour of nonautonomous systems. He co-authored the monograph Nonautonomous Dynamical Systems (AMS, 2011) with Martin Rasmussen, which systematically develops this theory.

=== Other contributions ===
Early in his career, Kloeden worked on problems in mathematical meteorology, including the well-posedness of the quasi-geostrophic equations. He generalized Sharkovsky's cycle coexistence order to higher-dimensional triangular mappings and also contributed to the theory of fuzzy sets, co-authoring Metric Spaces of Fuzzy Sets with Phil Diamond (World Scientific, 1994). More recently, he coauthored Attractors of Caputo Fractional Differential Equations with Thai Son Doan and Hoang The Tuan (Springer, 2025).

== Awards and honours ==
- Fellow of the Society for Industrial and Applied Mathematics (SIAM) (2009), cited for "contributions to stochastic and non-autonomous dynamical systems"
- W. T. and Idalia Reid Prize (2006), awarded by SIAM for fundamental contributions to the theoretical and computational analysis of differential equations
- Fellow of the Australian Mathematical Society (1995)
- Thousand Talents Plan Award (China, 2014)
- Nelder Visiting Fellowship, Imperial College London (2013)

== Selected publications ==
=== Selected Books ===
- Kloeden, P. E.; Platen, E. (1992). Numerical Solution of Stochastic Differential Equations. Springer. ISBN 978-3-540-54062-5.
- Diamond, P.; Kloeden, P. E. (1994). Metric Spaces of Fuzzy Sets: Theory and Applications. World Scientific. ISBN 978-981-02-1731-0.
- Kloeden, P. E.; Rasmussen, M. (2011). Nonautonomous Dynamical Systems. American Mathematical Society. ISBN 978-0-8218-6871-3.

=== Selected articles ===
- Cheban, D.; Kloeden, P. E.; Schmalfuss, B. (2002). "The relationship between pullback, forwards and global attractors of nonautonomous dynamical systems". Nonlinear Dynamics & Systems Theory, 9–28.
- Hutzenthaler, M.; Jentzen, A.; Kloeden, P. E. (2011). "Strong and weak divergence in finite time of Euler's method for stochastic differential equations with non-globally Lipschitz continuous coefficients". Proceedings of the Royal Society A, 467 (2130): 1563–1576.

== Personal life ==
Kloeden has a severe hearing impairment that has been alleviated by a cochlear implant. He was married to Karin Wahl-Kloeden, who died of cancer in 2016.
