= Ruth F. Curtain =

Australian mathematician (1941–2018)

Ruth F. Curtain (16 July 1941 – 18 March 2018) was an Australian mathematician who worked for many years in the Netherlands as a professor of mathematics at the University of Groningen. Her research concerned infinite-dimensional linear systems.

== Education and career ==
Curtain was born in Melbourne. She was the daughter of a house painter, who wanted her to leave school at age 14, but with the support of her mother she persisted. She studied mathematics at the University of Melbourne, earning a bachelor's degree in 1962, diploma in education in 1963, and master's degree in 1965. She moved to Brown University, in the United States, for graduate study in applied mathematics, and completed her Ph.D. there in 1969. Her dissertation, Stochastic Differential Equations In A Hilbert Space, was supervised by Peter Falb.

She then joined the faculty at Purdue University, but in 1971 moved to the University of Warwick. In 1977 she moved again, to the University of Groningen, where she remained until her 2006 retirement.

== Books ==
Curtain was the author of:

- Functional Analysis in Modern Applied Mathematics (with A. J. Pritchard, Academic Press, 1977)
- Infinite Dimensional Linear Systems Theory (with A. J. Pritchard, Springer, 1978)
- An Introduction to Infinite-Dimensional Linear Systems Theory (with Hans Zwart, Springer, 1995)

== Awards and honours ==
In 1991 Curtain was elected as a Fellow of the IEEE, associated with the IEEE Control Systems Society, "for contributions to the control theory of stochastic and infinite-dimensional systems".

In 2012 the Society for Industrial and Applied Mathematics gave Curtain their W. T. and Idalia Reid Prize for outstanding research in differential equations and control theory. The award citation recognized Curtain for her "fundamental contributions to the theory of infinite dimensional systems and the control of systems governed by partial and delay differential equation".
