= Elin Lindqvist =

Swedish writer (born 1982)

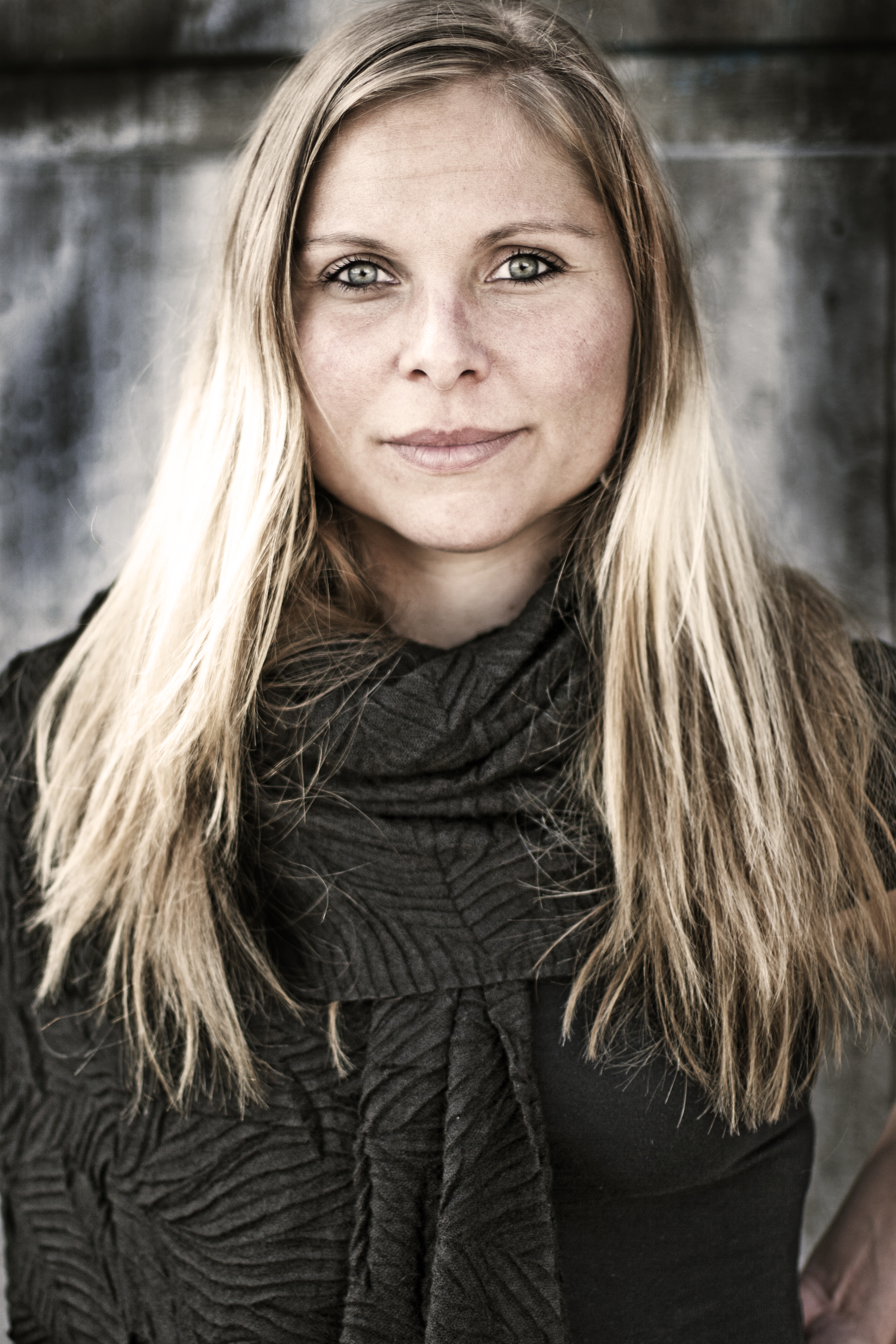
Elin Lindqvist

Elin Lindqvist (born 1982 in Tokyo) is a Swedish author. She made her debut as a writer in 2002 with the book "Tokyo Natt". She is the daughter of Herman Lindqvist.

== Bibliography ==
- Tokyo natt (2002)
- Tre röda näckrosor (2005)
- Facklan - en roman om Leon Larsson (2009)
