= Small-gain theorem =

Theorem used for studying closed-loop stability

Feedback connection between systems S_{1} and S_{2}.

In nonlinear systems, the formalism of input-output stability is an important tool in studying the stability of interconnected systems since the gain of a system directly relates to how the norm of a signal increases or decreases as it passes through the system. The small-gain theorem gives a sufficient condition for finite-gain $\mathcal{L}$ stability of the feedback connection. The small gain theorem was proved by George Zames in 1966. It can be seen as a generalization of the Nyquist criterion to non-linear time-varying MIMO systems (systems with multiple inputs and multiple outputs).

Theorem. Assume two stable systems $S_1$ and $S_2$ are connected in a feedback loop, then the closed loop system is input-output stable if $\|S_1\| \cdot \|S_2\| < 1$ and both $S_1$ and $S_2$ are stable by themselves. (This norm is typically the $\mathcal{H}_\infty$-norm, the size of the largest singular value of the transfer function over all frequencies. Any induced Norm will also lead to the same results).

A complementing result developed by Tryphon T. Georgiou, Khammash and Megretski (1997), referred to as the large-gain theorem, quantifies the minimum loop-gain needed to stabilize an unstable, possibly nonlinear and time-varying, plant; the minimum loop-gain being 1.

== See also ==
- Input-to-state stability
