= Karl Kunisch =

Austrian mathematician (born 1952)

- Born: 16 September 1952 (age 73); Linz, Austria
- Education: Graz University of Technology; Northwestern University
- Occupation: Mathematician

Karl Kunisch (born September 16, 1952 in Linz) is an Austrian mathematician.

== Life and work ==
Kunisch studied mathematics at the Graz University of Technology and at the Northwestern University, Evanston, USA. After his doctorate in 1978 at the Graz University of Technology on the topic of neutral functional-differential equations and semigroup theory, he obtained his habilitation in 1980 at the same university. In the following years, he repeatedly held visiting professor positions at the Lefschetz Center for Dynamical Systems of Brown University, USA.

From 1986 to 1993, Kunisch held a professor position at the Graz University of Technology before moving to Technische Universität Berlin. In 1996, he became Professor of Optimization and Optimal Control at the University of Graz, where he retired in the fall of 2020. Since 2012, he is also Scientific Director of the Johann Radon Institute for Computational and Applied Mathematics (RICAM) in Linz.

Kunisch authored over 360 publications in peer-reviewed journals as well as several books. He is a member of the editorial board of several mathematical journals including the SIAM Journal on Control and Optimization, SIAM Journal on Numerical Analysis, and the Journal of the European Mathematical Society. Between 2007 and 2018, Kunisch was speaker of the collaborative research center Mathematical Optimization and Applications in Biomedical Sciences. funded by the Austrian Science Fund. In 2008, he was awarded the Alwin-Walther medal of the Technische Universität Darmstadt. Kunisch was invited speaker at the International Congress of Mathematicians in Hyderabad, 2010. In 2015, he received an Advanced Grant of the European Research Council on the topic of From Open to Closed Loop Control. Since 2017, he is a SIAM Fellow of the Society for Industrial and Applied Mathematics (SIAM). He was awarded the W. T. and Idalia Reid Prize 2021.

== Research areas ==
- Optimization of partial differential equations
- Mathematical control theory
- Inverse problems and mathematical imaging
- Mathematical modelling in medicine
- Model reduction
- Scientific computing
- Mathematical data science
- Neutral functional-differential equations

== Publications (selected) ==
- Banks, H. T.; Kunisch, K. (1989). Estimation Techniques for Distributed Parameter Systems. Boston, MA: Birkhäuser Boston. ISBN 978-1-4612-3700-6. OCLC 852789183.
- Ito, Kazufumi; Kunisch, K. (2008). Lagrange multiplier approach to variational problems and applications. Philadelphia, PA: Society for Industrial and Applied Mathematics. ISBN 978-0-89871-649-8. OCLC 212204609.
- Bredies, Kristian; Kunisch, Karl; Pock, Thomas (2010). "Total Generalized Variation". SIAM Journal on Imaging Sciences. 3 (3). Society for Industrial & Applied Mathematics (SIAM): 492–526. doi:10.1137/090769521. ISSN 1936-4954. S2CID 6650697.
- Hintermüller, M.; Ito, K.; Kunisch, K. (2002). "The Primal-Dual Active Set Strategy as a Semismooth Newton Method" (PDF). SIAM Journal on Optimization. 13 (3). Society for Industrial & Applied Mathematics (SIAM): 865–888. doi:10.1137/s1052623401383558. ISSN 1052-6234.
- Kunisch, K.; Volkwein, S. (2002). "Galerkin Proper Orthogonal Decomposition Methods for a General Equation in Fluid Dynamics". SIAM Journal on Numerical Analysis. 40 (2). Society for Industrial & Applied Mathematics (SIAM): 492–515. doi:10.1137/s0036142900382612. ISSN 0036-1429.
- Engl, H W; Kunisch, K; Neubauer, A (1 August 1989). "Convergence rates for Tikhonov regularisation of non-linear ill-posed problems". Inverse Problems. 5 (4). IOP Publishing: 523–540. doi:10.1088/0266-5611/5/4/007. ISSN 0266-5611. S2CID 250770123.
