= Lindkvist =

Lindkvist is a Swedish surname, a variation of Lindqvist. Notable people with the surname include:

- Britt-Marie Lindkvist, Swedish politician
- Ebba Lindkvist, Swedish actress and film director
- Rasmus Lindkvist, Swedish footballer
- Sandra Lindkvist, Swedish footballer
- Ulla Lindkvist, Swedish orienteering competitor
- Ulrik Lindkvist (born 1981), Danish footballer
