= W. T. and Idalia Reid Prize =

Prize in Mathematics

The W. T. and Idalia Reid Prize is an annual award presented by the Society for Industrial and Applied Mathematics (SIAM) for outstanding research in, or other contributions to, the broadly defined areas of differential equations and control theory. It was established in 1994 in memory of long-time University of Oklahoma mathematics professor W. T. Reid, who died in 1977.

== Recipients ==
The recipients of the W .T. and Idalia Reid Prize are:

- 1994: Wendell H. Fleming
- 1996: Roger W. Brockett
- 1998: Jacques-Louis Lions
- 2000: Constantine Dafermos
- 2001: Eduardo D. Sontag
- 2002: Harvey Thomas Banks
- 2003: Harold J. Kushner
- 2004: Arthur J. Krener
- 2005: Christopher I. Byrnes
- 2006: Peter E. Kloeden
- 2007: Héctor J. Sussmann
- 2008: Max Gunzburger
- 2009: Anders Lindquist
- 2010: John A. Burns
- 2011: Irena Lasiecka
- 2012: Ruth F. Curtain
- 2013: Tyrone Duncan
- 2014: Alain Bensoussan
- 2015: Francis Clarke
- 2016: Yannís G. Kevrekidis
- 2017: Jean-Michel Coron
- 2018: Volker Mehrmann
- 2019: Miroslav Krstić
- 2020: Roland Glowinski
- 2021: Karl Kunisch
- 2022: Enrique Zuazua
- 2023: Robert John McCann
- 2024: Benedetto Piccoli
- 2025: Marius Tucsnak

== See also ==
- List of mathematics awards
