= Leon Larsson =

Swedish author and anarchist (1883–1922)

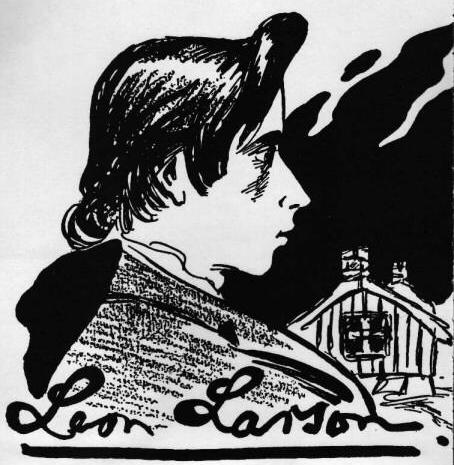
Larson

Leon Larsson (1883–1922), sometimes written Larson, was a Swedish author and anarchist.
