= Lindquist Apartment House =

Historic building in Portland, Oregon, U.S.

- U.S. National Register of Historic Places
- Portland Historic Landmark
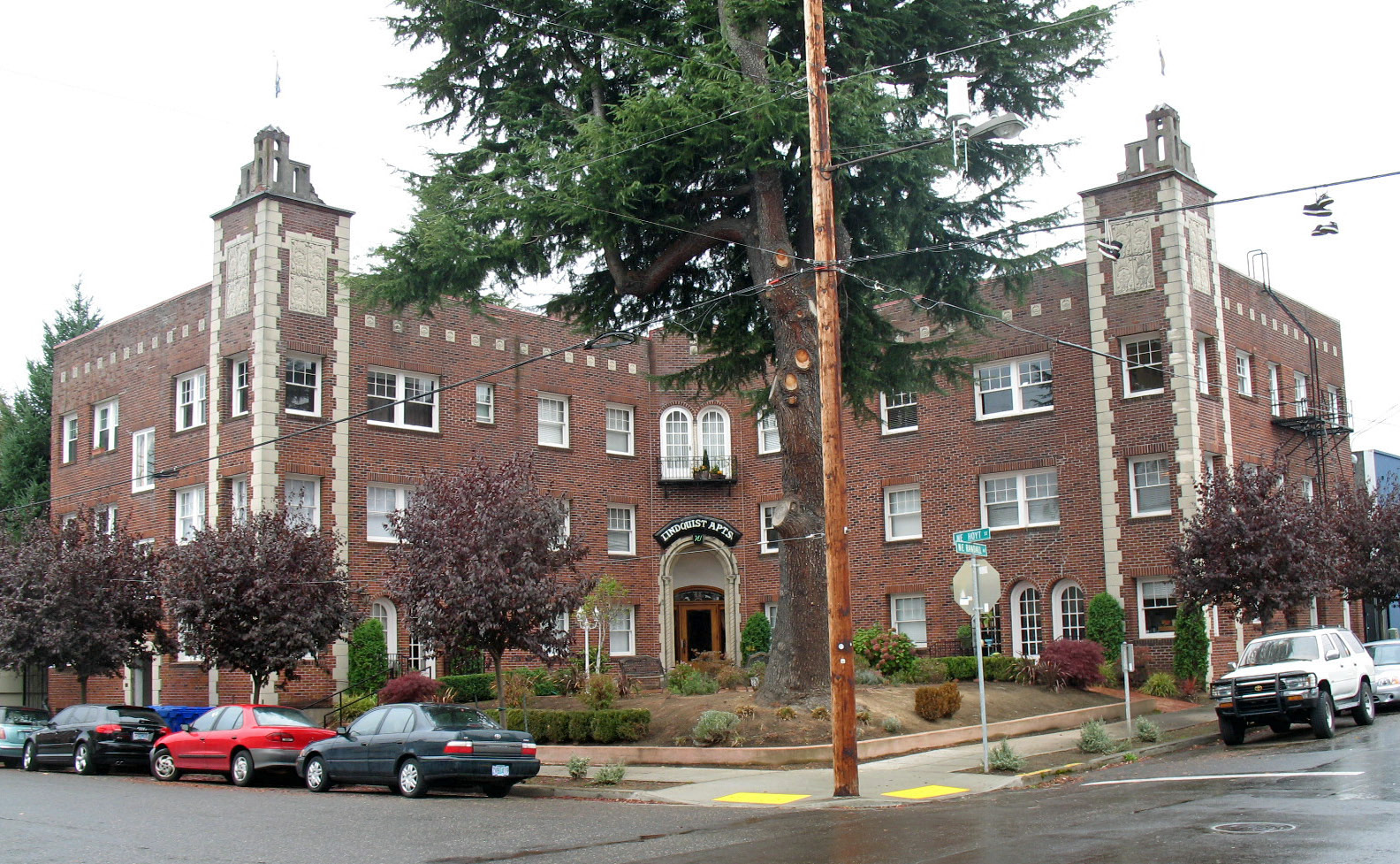

- Location within Portland, Oregon Location within Oregon Location within the United States
- Location: 711 NE Randall Street; Portland, Oregon
- Coordinates: 45°31′41″N 122°38′18″W
- Area: 0.2 acres (0.081 ha)
- Built: 1930
- Architect: Elmer Feig; Lindquist, Fred W.
- Architectural style: Mission/Spanish Revival
- NRHP reference No.: 93000022
- Added to NRHP: February 19, 1993

The Lindquist Apartment House is an apartment complex located in northeast Portland, Oregon listed on the National Register of Historic Places.

== See also ==
- National Register of Historic Places listings in Northeast Portland, Oregon
