= Grigori Milstein =

Russian mathematician (1937–2023)

Professor Grigori N. Milstein
- Born: June 6, 1937; Vinnytsia Oblast, USSR
- Died: November 22, 2023 (aged 86); New York City, United States
- Website: michaelvtretyakov.github.io/main/GNMilstein.htm

Grigori N. Milstein (Russian: Григорий Нойхович Мильштейн; 6 June 1937 – 22 November 2023) was a Russian mathematician who made many important contributions to Stochastic Numerics, Estimation, Control, Stability theory, Financial Mathematics.

== Biography ==
G.N. Milstein received his undergraduate degree in mathematics from the Ural State University (UrGU; Sverdlovsk, USSR), which is now Ural Federal University (Ekaterinburg, Russia). He completed his PhD studies at the same university. Milstein has been an assistant professor, associate professor and, after defending his DSc thesis, professor at the Faculty of Mathematics and Mechanics UrGU (then URFU). He also worked as senior researcher at the Weierstrass Institute for Applied Analysis and Stochastics (Berlin, Germany) and was a visiting professor at University of Leicester (Leicester, UK) and University of Manchester (Manchester, UK).

== Research ==
Milstein was a world-leading expert in Stochastic Numerics, Estimation, Control, Stability, Financial Mathematics.

He published four research monographs: The first of the listed books was the first monograph in the world published on the topic of numerical methods for stochastic differential equations. He also contributed to the second edition of R. Khasminskii "Stochastic Stability of Differential Equations", Springer, 2012.

He has published more than 100 journal papers.

In Milstein's early pioneering paper on Stochastic Numerics (1974,1975), he constructed a first-order mean-square method for SDEs that is known as Milstein method. In 1978, Milstein introduced weak-sense approximations of SDEs for the first time and proposed a number of weak schemes.

These papers became classics and now are the basis of the modern theory of numerical integration of stochastic differential equations.

In 1985-1987 Professor Milstein proved fundamental convergence theorems in the mean-square and weak sense, respectively, which became the foundation for constructing and analysing numerical methods for SDEs.
