= Carl G. Lindquist =

American politician (1895–1993)

Member of the Michigan House of Representatives
- In office January 1, 1941 – 1954

Personal details
- Born: Carl Gottfred Linquist; December 9, 1896 Norway, Michigan, U.S.
- Died: March 9, 1993 (aged 96) Crystal Falls, Michigan, U.S.
- Resting place: Bates Township Cemetery
- Party: Republican
- Spouse: Sylvia A. Peterson (m. 1929)
- Parent(s): Aldo Lindquist; Hanna Lindquist
- Profession: Politician, dairy farmer

Carl Gottfred Lindquist (December 9, 1896 – March 9, 1993) was a dairy farmer and legislator in Michigan. He served seven terms in the Michigan House of Representatives.

== Early life and education ==
Lindquist was born on December 9, 1896, in Norway, Michigan. His parents were Aldo Lindquist (1857–1922) and Hanna Lindquist (1869–1952). He was of Swedish ancestry.

Lindquist was educated in public schools in Iron River, Michigan, and Bates Township, Michigan.

== Career ==
Lindquist served as a clerk for two years, supervisor of Bates Township for six years, and was also a member of the school board.

Lindquist served seven terms in the Michigan House of Representatives, from 1941 to 1954 and was a Republican. He lived in Iron River from 1941 to 1952 and in Detroit in 1953 and 1954.

He succeeded Paul T. Schneider as a canvasser. Lindquist was a candidate for the Michigan Senate in 1956.

== Personal life and death ==
In August 1929, Lindquist married Sylvia A. Peterson (1901–1997). He had no children. Lindquist was a Lutheran and member of the Masonic lodge.

Lindquist died on March 9, 1993, in Crystal Falls, Michigan. He is buried at Bates Township Cemetery.
