= Carl Lindquist (actor) =

Swedish actor and singer

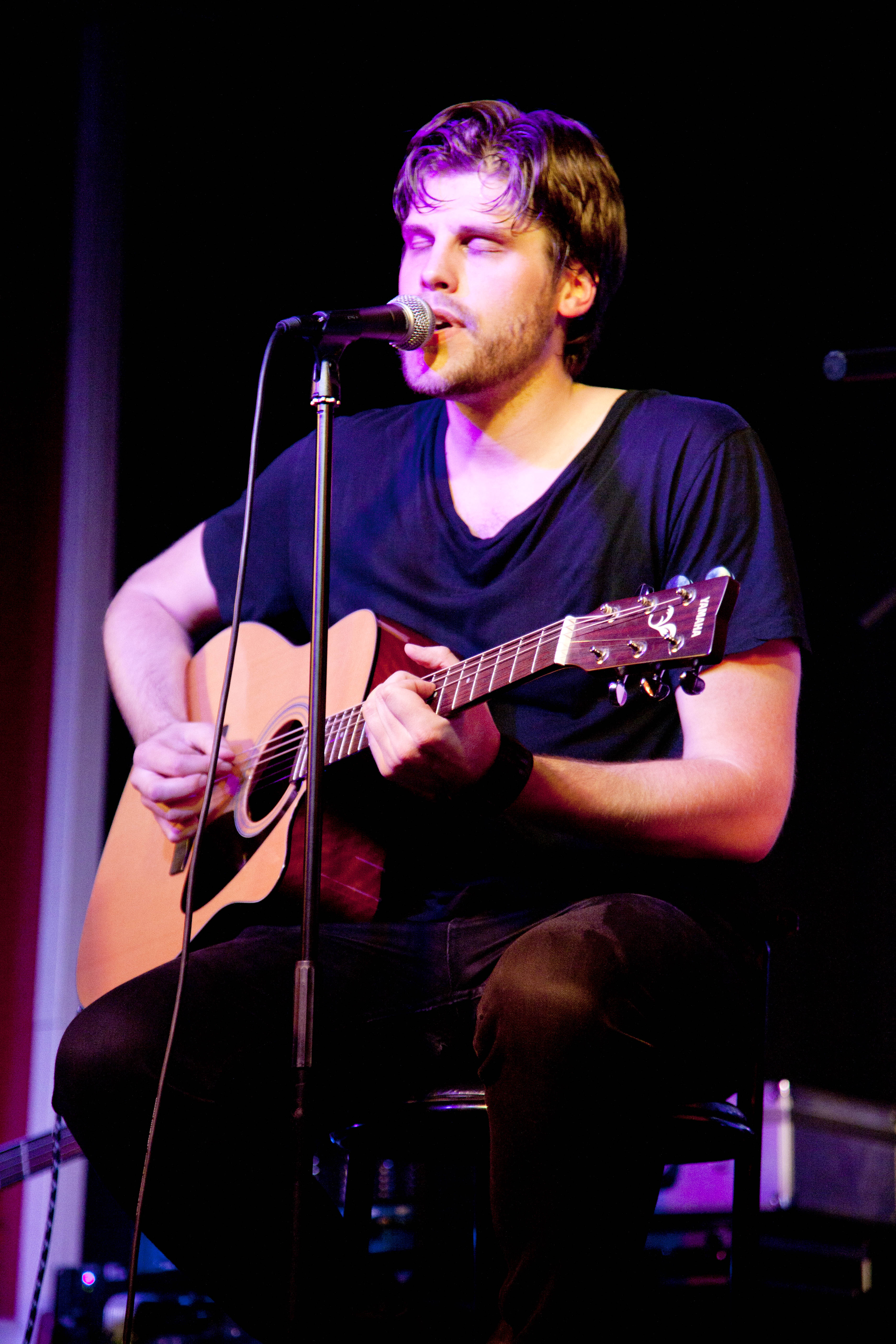
- Carl performing in Martigues, France 2015.

Background information
- Born: 17 June 1988 (age 37); Stockholm, Sweden
- Genres: Rock, pop, musical theatre
- Occupations: Actor, singer, voice artist
- Instruments: Vocals, guitar, piano
- Website: carl-lindquist.com

Carl Lindquist (born 17 June 1988) is a Swedish actor and singer. He appeared as Raoul in the Norwegian premiere of Andrew Lloyd Webber's The Phantom of the Opera at the Folketeateret in Oslo in 2018–2019. In 2016 he appeared as Peter in the European Tour of Bill Kenwright’s official production of Jesus Christ Superstar as well as playing leading man "Fred Gaily" in a UK Tour of Miracle on 34th Street (known as Here's Love) in 2015. He has also appeared on stage with Ramin Karimloo.

In 2020 he was the voice-over for the Swedish travel agency VING's commercials, broadcast on Swedish national television and online.

Carl is also a singer-songwriter and he released his debut solo EP, 'End of Our Road' in 2012.

== Theatre credits ==
Year(s)	Production	Role	Theatre	Location
2014	The Twelve Angry Jurors	Juror 4	Pleasance Theatre	Off West End
2014	Godspell	Ensemble	Lyric Theatre	West End
2014	The Drowsy Chaperone	Aldolpho	LOST Theatre	Off West End
2014	Time Management	Doctor	White Bear Theatre	Off West End
2015	Godspell	Ensemble	Hackney Empire	UK Tour
2015	Here's To Life	Man	—N/a	National Portrait Gallery
2015	Miracle on 34th Street	Fred Gaily	—N/a	UK Tour
2016	Jesus Christ Superstar	Peter	—N/a	European Tour
2017–18	Das Phantom der Oper	Der Perser/Cover Phantom	—N/a	European Tour
2018–19	The Phantom of the Opera	Raoul, Vicomte de Chagny	Folketeateret	Oslo

== Filmography ==
Film
Year	Title	Role	Notes
2015	Coffin (Short)	Matthew	
2017	Paddington 2	Prisoner	
2018	Gone To Mexico (Short)	Alan Gottfried	The film was screened at the Short Film Corner at the Cannes Film Festival 2018.
2021	Max (Short)	Max MacLean	Winner of two Monthly Indie Shorts Awards including Best Actor and Best Director.

Television
Year	Title	Role
2011	Hellenius Hörna	Såret
2018	The Investigator: A British Crime Story	Copper
2022	Clark	Sniper (voice)

== Video games ==
Year	Title	Credit
2019	SpellForce 3: Soul Harvest	Old Alyani (voice)

== Discography ==
=== Solo ===
- End of Our Road (EP) (2012)

=== With Coexistence ===
- Carrion Comfort (EP) (2009)
- Flow (2012)
- Everlasting Scars (2016)

=== With Anton Johansson's Galahad Suite ===
- Anton Johansson's Galahad Suite (2013)

== Awards and nominations ==
Year	Award	Category	Work	Result
2021	Monthly Indie Shorts Awards	Best Actor	Max (Short)	Won
2018	BroadwayWorld Norway Awards	Best Actor in a Musical	The Phantom of the Opera	Nominated
