= Herman Lindqvist (journalist) =

Swedish journalist

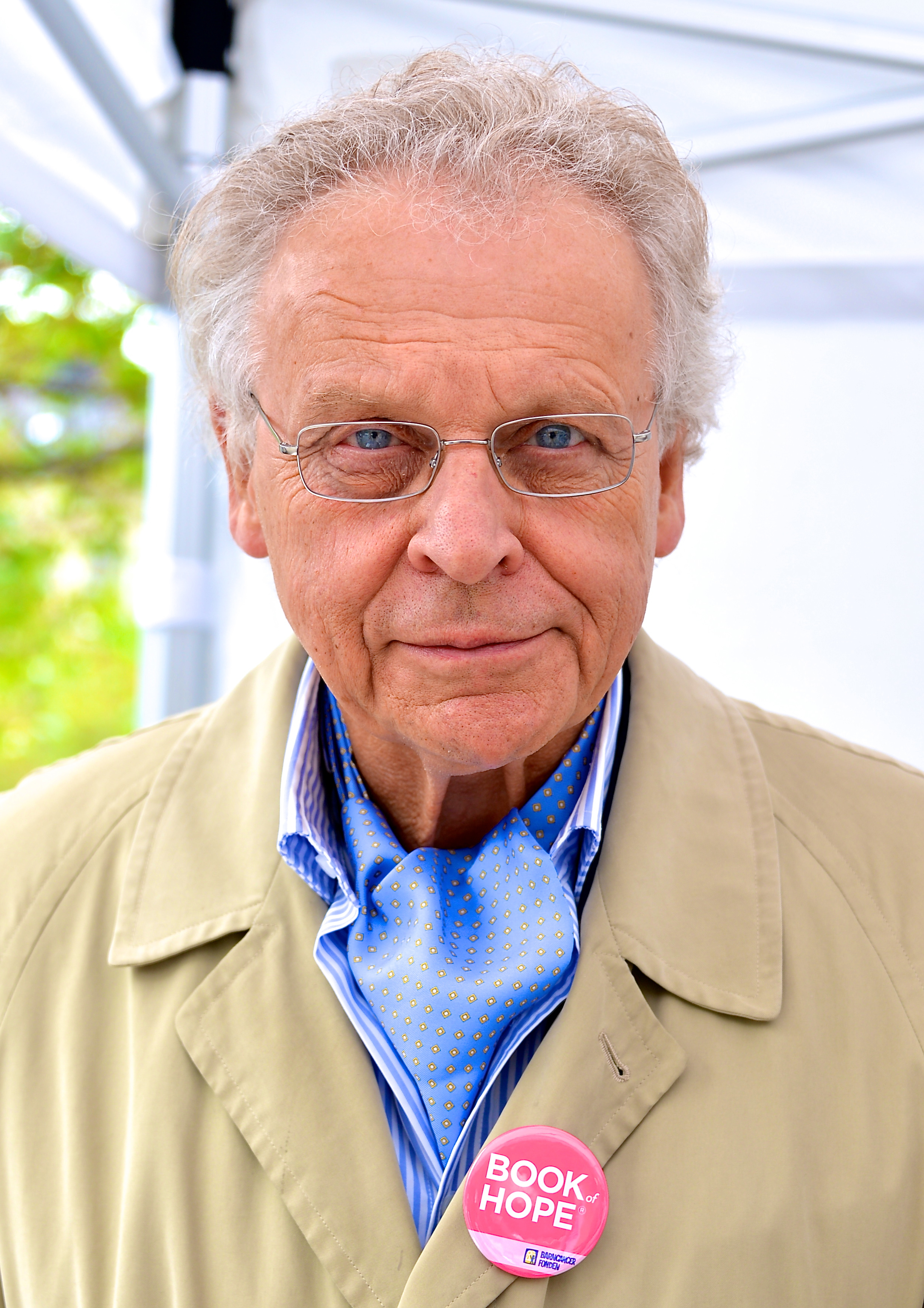
- Herman Lindqvist during a campaign for Barncancerfonden at Kungsträdgården in Stockholm (May 2013)
- Born: 1 April 1943 (age 83); Bromma, Stockholm, Sweden
- Occupations: Writer, journalist
- Partner: Liliana Komorowska
- Writing career
- Period: 1969–present
- Genre: Popular history
- Notable work: Historien om Sverige

Herman Lindqvist (born 1 April 1943 in Stockholm) is a Swedish journalist who has served as foreign correspondent in many countries and authored a number of popular books on Swedish history. In particular his multiple-volume Historien om Sverige (1992–2002) has become very popular, but has also drawn criticism for allegedly lacking historical accuracy.

His daughter Elin Lindqvist is a writer.
