= Lindquist Lake =

Lake in Wisconsin, United States

- Location within Wisconsin Location within the United States
- Location: Marinette County, Wisconsin, United States
- Coordinates: 45.615146°N 88.058604°W
- Type: Drainage
- Basin countries: United States
- Surface area: 73 acres (0.30 km^{2})
- Max. depth: 58 feet (18 m)
- Surface elevation: 968 ft (295 m)

Lindquist Lake is a freshwater lake in northeastern Wisconsin.

== Statistics ==
The lake covers 73 acres (0.30 km^{2}) and is at 968 ft (295 m) elevation. Fish species include bluegill, bass, and northern pike.

== Recreation ==
Located north of Green Bay, Wisconsin, just a few minutes east of Pembine, Wisconsin.
