= Milstein method =

Numerical method for solving stochastic differential equations

In mathematics, the Milstein method is a technique for the approximate numerical solution of a stochastic differential equation. It is named after Grigori Milstein who first published it in 1974.

== Description ==
Consider the autonomous Itō stochastic differential equation:
$$\mathrm{d} X_t = a(X_t) \, \mathrm{d} t + b(X_t) \, \mathrm{d} W_t$$
with initial condition $X_{0} = x_{0}$, where $W_{t}$ denotes the Wiener process, and suppose that we wish to solve this SDE on some interval of time $[0,T]$. Then the Milstein approximation to the true solution $X$ is the Markov chain $Y$ defined as follows:

- Partition the interval $[0,T]$ into $N$ equal subintervals of width $\Delta t>0$:
  $$0 = \tau_0 < \tau_1 < \dots < \tau_N = T\text{ with }\tau_n:=n\Delta t\text{ and }\Delta t = \frac{T}{N}$$
- Set $Y_0 = x_0;$
- Recursively define $Y_n$ for $1 \leq n \leq N$ by:
  $$Y_{n + 1} = Y_n + a(Y_n) \Delta t + b(Y_n) \Delta W_n + \frac{1}{2} b(Y_n) b'(Y_n) \left( (\Delta W_n)^2 - \Delta t \right)$$
  where $b'$ denotes the derivative of $b(x)$ with respect to $x$ and:
  $$\Delta W_n = W_{\tau_{n + 1}} - W_{\tau_n}$$
  are independent and identically distributed normal random variables with expected value zero and variance $\Delta t$. Then $Y_n$ will approximate $X_{\tau_n}$ for $0 \leq n \leq N$, and increasing $N$ will yield a better approximation.

Note that when $b'(Y_n) = 0$ (i.e. the diffusion term does not depend on $X_{t}$) this method is equivalent to the Euler–Maruyama method.

The Milstein scheme has both weak and strong order of convergence $\Delta t$ which is superior to the Euler–Maruyama method, which in turn has the same weak order of convergence $\Delta t$ but inferior strong order of convergence $\sqrt{\Delta t}$.

== Intuitive derivation ==
For this derivation, we will only look at geometric Brownian motion (GBM), the stochastic differential equation of which is given by:
$$\mathrm{d} X_t = \mu X \mathrm{d} t + \sigma X d W_t$$
with real constants $\mu$ and $\sigma$. Using Itō's lemma we get:
$$\mathrm{d}\ln X_t= \left(\mu - \frac{1}{2} \sigma^2\right)\mathrm{d}t+\sigma\mathrm{d}W_t$$

Thus, the solution to the GBM SDE is:
$$\begin{align}
X_{t+\Delta t}&=X_t\exp\left\{\int_t^{t+\Delta t}\left(\mu-\frac{1}{2}\sigma^2\right)\mathrm{d}t+\int_t^{t+\Delta t}\sigma\mathrm{d}W_u\right\} \\
&\approx X_t\left(1+\mu\Delta t-\frac{1}{2} \sigma^2\Delta t+\sigma\Delta W_t+\frac{1}{2}\sigma^2(\Delta W_t)^2\right) \\
&= X_t + a(X_t)\Delta t+b(X_t)\Delta W_t+\frac{1}{2}b(X_t)b'(X_t)((\Delta W_t)^2-\Delta t)
\end{align}$$
where
$$a(x) = \mu x, ~b(x) = \sigma x$$

The numerical solution is presented in the graphic for three different trajectories.

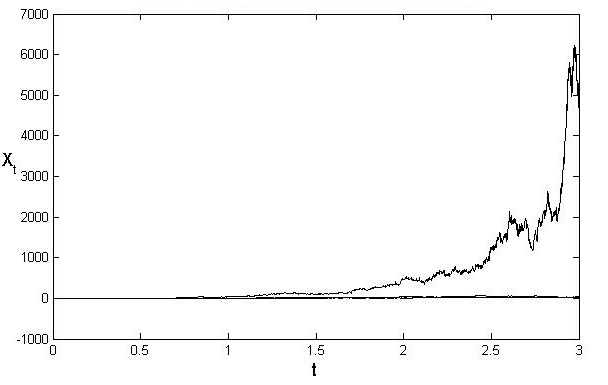
Numerical solution for the stochastic differential equation where the drift is twice the diffusion coefficient.

=== Computer implementation ===
The following Python code implements the Milstein method and uses it to solve the SDE describing geometric Brownian motion defined by
$$\begin{cases}
dY_t= \mu Y \, {\mathrm d}t + \sigma Y \, {\mathrm d}W_t \\
Y_0=Y_\text{init}
\end{cases}$$

# -*- coding: utf-8 -*-
# Milstein Method

import numpy as np
import matplotlib.pyplot as plt


class Model:
    """Stochastic model constants."""
    mu = 3
    sigma = 1


def dW(dt):
    """Random sample normal distribution."""
    return np.random.normal(loc=0.0, scale=np.sqrt(dt))


def run_simulation():
    """ Return the result of one full simulation."""
    # One second and thousand grid points
    T_INIT = 0
    T_END = 1
    N = 1000 # Compute 1000 grid points
    DT = float(T_END - T_INIT) / N
    TS = np.arange(T_INIT, T_END + DT, DT)

    Y_INIT = 1

    # Vectors to fill
    ys = np.zeros(N + 1)
    ys[0] = Y_INIT
    for i in range(1, TS.size):
        t = (i - 1) * DT
        y = ys[i - 1]
        dw = dW(DT)

        # Sum up terms as in the Milstein method
        ys[i] = y + \
            Model.mu * y * DT + \
            Model.sigma * y * dw + \
            (Model.sigma**2 / 2) * y * (dw**2 - DT)

    return TS, ys


def plot_simulations(num_sims: int):
    """Plot several simulations in one image."""
    for _ in range(num_sims):
        plt.plot(*run_simulation())

    plt.xlabel("time (s)")
    plt.ylabel("y")
    plt.grid()
    plt.show()


if __name__ == "__main__":
    NUM_SIMS = 2
    plot_simulations(NUM_SIMS)

== See also ==
- Euler–Maruyama method
