= Anders Lindquist =

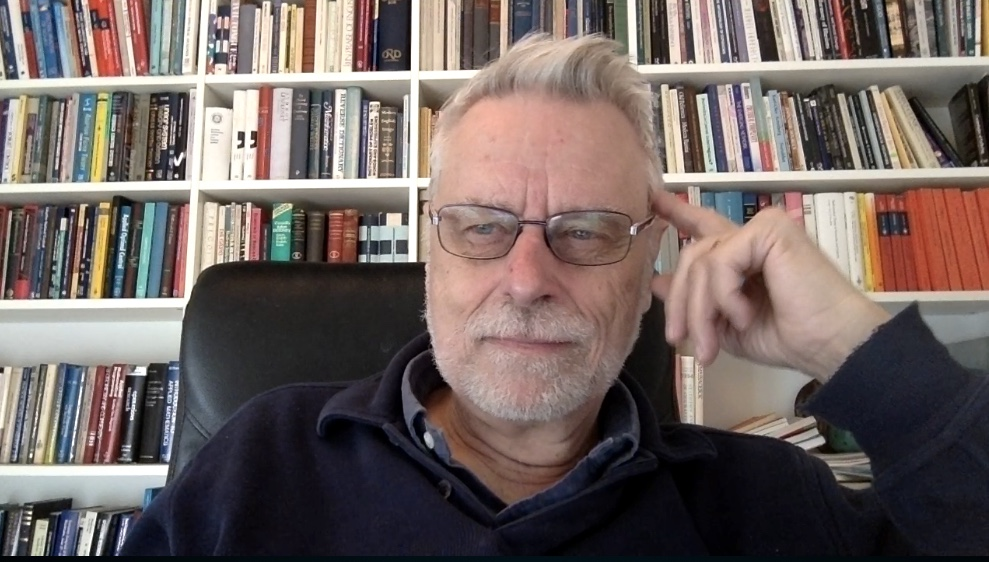
- Born: 21 November 1942 (age 83); Lund, Sweden
- Education: KTH Royal Institute of Technology
- Awards: W. T. and Idalia Reid Prize in Mathematics (2009); Honorary Doctorate from The Technion (2010); IEEE Control Systems Award (2020)
- Scientific career
- Fields: Mathematics and Systems Theory

Anders Gunnar Lindquist (born 21 November 1942) is a Swedish applied mathematician and control theorist. He has made contributions to the theory of partial realization, stochastic modeling, estimation and control, and moment problems in systems and control. He is known for the discovery of the fast filtering algorithms for (discrete-time) Kalman filtering in the early 1970s, and his work on the separation principle of stochastic optimal control and, in collaborations with Giorgio Picci, the Geometric Theory for Stochastic Realization.

Together with Tryphon T. Georgiou and Christopher I. Byrnes, Lindquist is one of the founders of the so-called Byrnes-Georgiou-Lindquist school. They developed a new moment-based approach for the solution of control and estimation problems with complexity constraints.

== Biography ==
Lindquist was born in Lund, Sweden. He received his PhD degree from KTH Royal Institute of Technology in Stockholm under the supervision of Lars Erik Zachrisson, and was appointed a Docent of Optimization and Systems Theory in 1972. Subsequently, he held visiting positions at the University of Florida, Brown University, and the University at Albany, SUNY, until 1974, when he joined the faculty of Mathematics at the University of Kentucky. He remained at Kentucky until 1983 at which time he returned to the Royal Institute of Technology as a Professor and the Chair of Optimization and Systems Theory.

Over the years, Lindquist has held visiting and affiliate positions at the Washington University in St. Louis, the University of Padova, Consiglio Nazionale delle Ricerche, Arizona State University, the International Institute of Applied Systems Analysis in Vienna, the Russian Academy of Sciences in Moscow, East China Normal University in Shanghai, the Technion in Haifa, the University of California at Berkeley, and the University of Kyoto. He was the Head of the Mathematics Department at the Royal Institute of Technology from 2000 until 2009. Between 2006 and 2014 he was the Director of the Strategic Research Center for Industrial and Applied Mathematics (CIAM) at KTH. In 2011 he was appointed Zhiyuan Chair Professor and Qian Ren Scholar at Shanghai Jiao Tong University.

Lindquist is a member of the Royal Swedish Academy of Engineering Sciences (IVA), a Foreign Member of the Chinese Academy of Sciences (2015), a Member of the Academia Europaea (Academy of Europe), an Honorary Member of Hungarian Operations Research Society, and a Foreign Member of Russian Academy of Natural Sciences. He is a Life Fellow of the IEEE, a Fellow of the Society for Industrial and Applied Mathematics and a Fellow of the International Federation of Automatic Control. He was awarded the SIGEST of the SIAM Review (2001) and the George S. Axelby Award of the IEEE Control Systems Society (2003). He was the Zaborszky Distinguished Lecturer in 2000 and the Distinguished Israel Pollak Lecturer in 2005 and 2006. He received the W. T. and Idalia Reid Prize in Mathematics in 2009 for his "fundamental contributions to the theory of stochastic systems, signals, and control" and an Honorary Doctorate (Doctor Scientiarum Honoris Causa) from The Technion in 2010. He is the recipient of the 2020 IEEE Field Medal in Systems and Control, the IEEE Control Systems Award. Anders Lindquist is a Knight Commander with Star of the Order of the Holy Sepulchre.

== Selected publications ==
- A. Lindquist, On feedback control of linear stochastic systems, SIAM J.Control, 11 (May 1973), 323–343.
- A. Lindquist with G. Picci, On the stochastic realization problem, SIAM J. Control and Optimization, 17 (1979), 365–389.
- W.B. Gragg and A. Lindquist, On the partial realization problem, Linear Algebra and Appl.50 (1983), 277–319.
- A. Lindquist and G. Picci, Realization theory for multivariate stationary Gaussian processes, SIAM J. Control and Optimization 23 (1985), 809–857.
- C. I. Byrnes, A. Lindquist, S. V. Gusev and A. S. Matveev, A complete parameterization of all positive rational extensions of a covariance sequence, IEEE Transactions on Automatic Control AC-40 (1995), 1841–1857.
- A. Lindquist and V.A. Yakubovich, Optimal damping of forced oscillations in discrete-time systems, IEEE Transactions on Automatic Control AC-42 (1997), 786–802.
- C. I. Byrnes, S. V. Gusev and Lindquist, From finite covariance windows to modeling filters: A convex optimization approach, SIAM Review 43 (December 2001), 645–675.
- C. I. Byrnes, T. T. Georgiou, A. Lindquist and A. Megretski, Generalized interpolation in H-infinity with a complexity constraint, Trans. American Mathematical Society 358 (2006), no. 3, pp. 965–987.
- A. Lindquist and G. Picci, The circulant rational covariance extension problem: the complete solution, IEEE Transactions on Automatic Control 58 (November 2013), 2848–2861.
- Linear Stochastic Systems: A Geometric Approach to Modeling, Estimation and Identification. Series in Contemporary Mathematics. Vol. 1. Springer. 2015. doi:10.1007/978-3-662-45750-4. ISBN 9783662457498.
