= Yahalom =

Yahalom (meaning "diamond" in Hebrew) may refer to:

- Yahalom (IDF), the elite combat engineering unit of the Israel Defense Forces Engineering Corps
- Yahalom (protocol), networking security protocol used to authenticate and interchange symmetric keys over a non-trusted network like the Internet.
- Operation Diamond, or Mivtza' Yahalom, an operation undertaken by Mossad
- Yahalom (surname)
