= Empirical distribution =

Empirical distribution may refer to:

- Empirical distribution function
- Empirical measure
