= McKean–Vlasov process =

Stochastic diffusion process in probability theory

In probability theory, a McKean–Vlasov process is a stochastic process described by a stochastic differential equation where the coefficients of the diffusion depend on the distribution of the solution itself. The equations are a model for Vlasov equation and were first studied by Henry McKean in 1966. It is an example of propagation of chaos, in that it can be obtained as a limit of a mean-field system of interacting particles: as the number of particles tends to infinity, the interactions between any single particle and the rest of the pool will only depend on the particle itself.

== Definition ==
Consider a measurable function $\sigma:\R^d \times \mathcal{P}(\R^d)\to \mathcal{M}_{d}(\R)$ where $\mathcal{P}(\R^d)$ is the space of probability distributions on $\R^d$ equipped with the Wasserstein metric $W_2$ and $\mathcal{M}_{d}(\R)$ is the space of square matrices of dimension $d$. Consider a measurable function $b:\R^d\times \mathcal{P}(\R^d)\to \R^d$. Define $a(x,\mu) := \sigma(x,\mu)\sigma(x,\mu)^T$.

A stochastic process $(X_t)_{t\geq 0}$ is a McKean–Vlasov process if it solves the following system:

- $X_0$ has law $f_0$
- $dX_t = \sigma(X_t, \mu_t) dB_t + b(X_t, \mu_t) dt$

where $\mu_t = \mathcal{L}(X_t)$ describes the law of $X$ and $B_t$ denotes a $d$-dimensional Wiener process. This process is non-linear, in the sense that the associated Fokker–Planck equation for $\mu_t$ is a non-linear partial differential equation.

== Existence of a solution ==
The following Theorem can be found in.

Existence of a solution—Suppose $b$ and $\sigma$ are globally Lipschitz, that is, there exists a constant $C>0$ such that:

$|b(x,\mu)-b(y,\nu)| + |\sigma(x,\mu)-\sigma(y,\nu)| \leq C(|x-y|+W_2(\mu,\nu))$

where $W_2$ is the Wasserstein metric.

Suppose $f_0$ has finite variance.

Then for any $T>0$ there is a unique strong solution to the McKean-Vlasov system of equations on $[0,T]$. Furthermore, its law is the unique solution to the non-linear Fokker–Planck equation:

$\partial_t \mu_t(x) = -\nabla \cdot \{b(x,\mu_t)\mu_t\} + \frac{1}{2}\sum\limits_{i,j=1}^d \partial_{x_i}\partial_{x_j}\{a_{ij}(x,\mu_t)\mu_t\}$

== Propagation of chaos ==
The McKean-Vlasov process is an example of propagation of chaos. What this means is that many McKean-Vlasov process can be obtained as the limit of discrete systems of stochastic differential equations $(X_t^i)_{1\leq i\leq N}$.

Formally, define $(X^i)_{1\leq i\leq N}$ to be the $d$-dimensional solutions to:

- $(X_0^i)_{1\leq i\leq N}$ are i.i.d with law $f_0$
- $dX_t^i = \sigma(X_t^i, \mu_{X_t}) dB_t^i + b(X_t^i, \mu_{X_t}) dt$

where the $(B^i)_{1\leq i\leq N}$ are i.i.d Brownian motion, and $\mu_{X_t}$ is the empirical measure associated with $X_t$ defined by $\mu_{X_t} := \frac{1}{N}\sum\limits_{1\leq i\leq N} \delta_{X_t^i}$ where $\delta$ is the Dirac measure.

Propagation of chaos is the property that, as the number of particles $N\to +\infty$, the interaction between any two particles vanishes, and the random empirical measure $\mu_{X_t}$ is replaced by the deterministic distribution $\mu_t$.

Under some regularity conditions, the mean-field process just defined will converge to the corresponding McKean-Vlasov process.

== Applications ==
- Mean-field theory
- Mean-field game theory
- Random matrices: including Dyson's model on eigenvalue dynamics for random symmetric matrices and the Wigner semicircle distribution
