= Alex Fraser (scientist) =

Alex Fraser (1923 – 14 July 2002) was a major innovator in the development of the computer modeling of population genetics and his work has stimulated many advances in genetic research over the past decades.

His efforts in the 1950s and 1960s had a profound impact on the development of computational models of evolutionary systems. His seminal work, "Simulation of genetic systems by automatic digital computers" (1958), is quoted in the literature to this day.

Fraser was born in London, England, and lived in Hong Kong for most of his youth. He studied at the University of New Zealand, and later went to the University of Edinburgh, and subsequently to the Commonwealth Scientific and Industrial Research Organisation (CSIRO) in Sydney, Australia.

It was at the CSIRO where Fraser made his seminal contributions to evolutionary computation. His earliest work was done on the SILIAC computer that was installed for the University of Sydney in 1956. The SILIAC was the Australian cousin to the ILLIAC machine that was developed at the University of Illinois Urbana-Champaign. The machine was said to be running well when one could hear a 'rhythmic clicking of the relays inside it.' The clicking indicated that the computer was processing the iterations of the program correctly. Fraser began using it to simulate genetic selection processes.

Fraser also starred in multiple TV shows during the early days of Australian television. His time with "Science in Close-Up" ended in a dramatic departure when censors refused to permit airing of a childbirth. Such footage is commonplace today but was forbidden at the time and that was why he walked out of the show. A surprisingly popular show was his "Doorway to Knowledge" as it was fairly sophisticated science that was broadcast at eleven o'clock in the morning. He achieved a certain measure of celebrity through the shows and he turned up quite regularly in the Sydney Morning Herald, the city's primary newspaper.

In the 1960s, Fraser moved to the United States to act as visiting professor at the University of California, Davis. In 1967, he took over the Headship of Biological Sciences at the University of Cincinnati.

In 1983, Fraser suffered a stroke which left him unable to converse normally. The timing of this event was most tragic because Fraser was left unable to engage his colleagues, just at the time when interest in evolutionary models and simulations was beginning to rise within computer science.

In 1999, Fraser received the 1999 IEEE Neural Networks Council Pioneer Award in Evolutionary Computation. He died 14 July 2002 at the age of 78, as a result of complications from a heart attack.
