= Yahalom (surname) =

Yahalom may refer to:

- Joseph Yahalom (Hebrew: יוסף יהלום; born 1941), an Israeli professor of Hebrew literature
- Shaul Yahalom (Hebrew: שאול יהלום; born 1947), Israeli politician

== Yaglom ==
Yaglom, Jaglom (Russian: Ягло́м) are Russianized Hebrew form:

- Isaak Moiseevich Yaglom (Russian: Иссак Моисе́евич Ягло́м; 1921, Kharkiv - 1988), a Jewish Ukrainian/Soviet mathematician and author of popular mathematics books
- Akiva Moiseevich Yaglom (Russian: Акива Моисе́евич Ягло́м; 1921, Kharkiv - 2007), a Jewish Ukrainian-Russian physicist, mathematician, statistician, and meteorologist
- Henry Jaglom (1938–2025), American actor, film director and playwright
