= Moshe Zakai =

Israeli scientist (born 1926–2015)

- משה זכאי
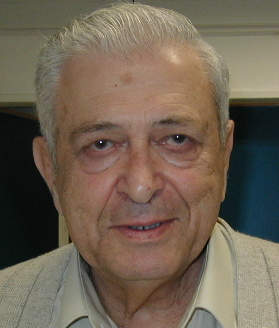
- Born: 22 December 1926; Sokółka, Poland
- Died: 27 November 2015 (aged 88); Haifa, Israel
- Education: University of Illinois at Urbana–Champaign
- Spouse: Shulamit (Mita) Briskman
- Scientific career
- Fields: Electrical engineering
- Workplaces: Technion

Moshe Zakai (Hebrew: משה זכאי; December 22, 1926 – November 27, 2015) was a Distinguished Professor at the Technion, Israel in electrical engineering, member of the Israel Academy of Sciences and Humanities and Rothschild Prize winner.

== Biography ==
Moshe Zakai was born in Sokółka, Poland, to his parents Rachel and Eliezer Zakheim with whom he immigrated to Israel in 1936. He got the BSc degree in electrical engineering from the Technion – Israel Institute of Technology in 1951. He joined the scientific department of the Defense Minister of Israel, where he was assigned to research and development of radar systems. From 1956 to 1958, he did graduate work at the University of Illinois on an Israeli Government Fellowship, and was awarded the PhD in electrical engineering. He then returned to the scientific department as head of the communication research group. In 1965, he joined the faculty of the Technion as an associate professor. In 1969, he was promoted to the rank of professor and in 1970, he was appointed the holder of the Fondiller Chair in Telecommunication. He was appointed distinguished professor in 1985. From 1970 until 1973, he served as the dean of the faculty of Electrical Engineering, and from 1976 to 1978 he served as vice president of academic affairs. He retired in 1998 as distinguished professor emeritus.

Moshe Zakai was married to Shulamit (Mita) Briskman, they have 3 children and 12 grandchildren.

== Major awards ==
- 1973 Fellow of the Institute of Electrical and Electronics Engineers (IEEE)
- 1988 Fellow of the Institute of Mathematical Statistics
- 1989 Foreign member of the US National Academy of Engineering
- 1993 Member of the Israel Academy of Sciences and Humanities
- 1993 The IEEE Control Systems Award
- 1994 The Rothschild Prize in Engineering

== Research ==
=== Background ===
Zakai's main research concentrated on the study of the theory of stochastic processes and its application to information and control problems; namely, problems of noise in communication radar and control systems. The basic class of random processes which represent the noise in such systems are known as "white noise" or the "Wiener process" where the white noise is "something like a derivative" of the Wiener process. Since these processes vary quickly with time, the classical differential and integral calculus is not applicable to such processes. In the 1940s Kiyoshi Itō developed a stochastic calculus (the Ito calculus) for such random processes.

=== The relation between classical and Ito calculi ===
From the results of Ito it became clear, back in the 1950s, that if a sequence of smooth functions which present the input to a physical system converge to something like a Brownian motion, then the sequence of outputs of the system do not converge in the classical sense. Several papers written by Eugene Wong and Zakai clarified the relation between the two approaches. This opened up the way to the application of the Ito calculus to problems in physics and engineering. These results are often referred to as Wong-Zakai corrections or theorems.

=== Nonlinear filtering ===
The solution to the problem of the optimal filtering of a wide class of linear dynamical system is known as the Kalman filter. This led to the same problem for nonlinear dynamical systems. The results for this case were highly complicated and were initially studied by Stratonovich in 1959 - 1960 and later by Kushner in 1964, leading to the Kushner-Stratonovich equation, a non-linear stochastic partial differential equation (SPDE) for the conditional probability density representing the optimal filter. Around 1967, Zakai derived a considerably simpler SPDE for an unnormalized version of the optimal filter density. It is known as the Zakai equation, and it has the great advantage of being a linear SPDE. The Zakai equation has been the starting point for further research work in this field.

=== Comparing practical solutions with the optimal solution ===
In many cases the optimal design of communication or radar operating under noise is too complicated to be practical, while practical solutions are known. In such cases it is extremely important to know how close the practical solution is to the theoretically optimal one.

=== Extension of the Ito calculus to the two-parameter processes ===
White noise and Brownian motion (the Wiener process) are functions of a single parameter, namely time. For problems such as rough surfaces it is necessary to extend the Ito calculus to two parameter Brownian sheets. Several papers which he wrote jointly with Wong extend the Ito integral to a "two-parameter" time. They also showed that every functional of the Brownian sheet can be represented as an extended integral.

=== The Malliavin calculus and its application ===
In addition to the Ito calculus, Paul Malliavin developed in the 1970s a "stochastic calculus of variations", now known as the Malliavin calculus. It turned out that in this setup it is possible to define a stochastic integral which will include the Ito integral. The papers of Zakai with David Nualart, Ali Süleyman Üstünel and Zeitouni promoted the understanding and applicability of the Malliavin calculus.

The monograph of Üstünel and Zakai deals with the application of the Malliavin calculus to derive relations between the Wiener process and other processes which are in some sense "similar" to the probability law of the Wiener process.

In the last decade he extended to transformations which are in some sense a "rotation" of the Wiener process and with Ustunel extended to some general cases results of information theory which were known for simpler spaces.

=== Further information ===
- On his life and research, see pages xi–xiv of the volume in honor of Zakai's 65 birthday.
- For the list of publications until 1990, see pages xv–xx. For publications between 1990 and 2000, see [17]. For later publications search for M Zakai in arXiv.

== See also ==
- Ziv–Zakai bound
