= Marta Sanz-Solé =

Spanish mathematician

Marta Sanz-Solé (born 19 January 1952 in Sabadell, Barcelona) is a Catalan mathematician specializing in probability theory. She obtained her PhD in 1978 from the University of Barcelona under the supervision of David Nualart.

== Career ==
Sanz-Solé is professor at the University of Barcelona, and head of the research group on stochastic processes. Prior to taking up her post at the UB, she was associate professor at the University Autònoma of Barcelona. She was Dean of the Faculty of Mathematics UB from 1993-1996, and Vice-president of the Division of Experimental Sciences and Mathematics from 2000-2003. In May 2015 she was appointed chair of the scientific Committee of the Graduate School of Mathematics (BGSMath). and from May 2018 until October 2019, she held the position of Director.

== Research ==
Her research interests are in stochastic analysis, in particular stochastic differential and partial differential equations. She has published more than 100 scientific articles according to MathSciNet and zbMath Open. and a monograph on Malliavin calculus and applications to SPDEs.

== Service ==
Sanz-Solé served in the executive committee of the European Mathematical Society in 1997-2004. She was elected president in 2010, and held the post from January 2011 to December 2014. She is or has been member of several international committees overseeing the mathematical sciences. In particular, the Board of Directors of the Institut Henri Poincaré, the FSMP (Fondation Sciences Mathématiques de Paris), the committee for research and education of the École Polytechnique, and the Scientific Committee of CIRM (Centre des Rencontres Mathématiques, Luminy, France). In the past years, she served in the Scientific Council of the Banach Center (2010-2014), the Fellows Committee of the Institute of Mathematical Statistics (2012-2014), and the Committee of Special Lectures (2008-2010). She was a member of the Board of Directors of the Centre de Recerca Matemàtica (Bellaterra, Barcelona) for a three-year period, starting April 2007. On the list of her editorial service there is the membership of the editorial board of the Annals of Probability from 2015 to 2020. In June 2015, she was appointed member of the Abel Committee for the Abel Prize 2016, 2017. She served at the ERC Consolidator Grant panel PE1 in 2015, 2017, 2019 and 2021, and was the chair in the last two calls.

== Recognition ==
In 1998 she was awarded with Narcis Monturiol Medal of Scientific and Technological Excellence by the Generalitat of Catalonia. In 2011 she was elected Fellow of the Institute of Mathematical Statistics. In november 2016, she was elected numerary member of the Institute of Catalan Studies. In 2017 she was awarded the Real Sociedad Matemática Española Medal for her scientific contributions and relevant international positions and service. The same year, she was elected honorary fellow of the Catalan College of Economists . In January 2019, she became numerary member of the Royal Academy of Sciences and Arts of Barcelona. Since 2024, she is member of the Academia Europaea.

On the occasion of her 70th birthday, she was honoured with the conference Stochastic Analysis and Stochastic Partial Differential Equations, held at the Centre de Recerca Matemàtica in June 2022.
