= SPDE =

SPDE may refer to:

- stochastic partial differential equation
- The stock symbol of Spedus Corp (NASDAQ)
- Scala Processing Development Environment, see Processing § Spde
