= Filtering problem (stochastic processes) =

Mathematical model for state estimation

In the theory of stochastic processes, filtering describes the problem of determining the state of a system from an incomplete and potentially noisy set of observations. For example, in GPS navigation, filtering helps estimate a car’s true position (the state) from noisy satellite signals (the observations). While originally motivated by problems in engineering, filtering found applications in many fields from signal processing to finance.

The problem of optimal non-linear filtering (even for the non-stationary case) was solved by Ruslan L. Stratonovich (1959, 1960), see also Harold J. Kushner's work and Moshe Zakai's, who introduced a simplified dynamics for the unnormalized conditional law of the filter known as the Zakai equation. The solution, however, is infinite-dimensional in the general case. Certain approximations and special cases are well understood: for example, the linear filters are optimal for Gaussian random variables, and are known as the Wiener filter and the Kalman-Bucy filter. More generally, as the solution is infinite dimensional, it requires finite dimensional approximations to be implemented in a computer with finite memory. A finite dimensional approximated nonlinear filter may be more based on heuristics, such as the extended Kalman filter or the assumed density filters, or more methodologically oriented such as for example the projection filters, some sub-families of which are shown to coincide with the assumed density filters. Particle filters are another option to attack the infinite dimensional filtering problem and are based on sequential Monte Carlo methods.

In general, if the separation principle applies, then filtering also arises as part of the solution of an optimal control problem. For example, the Kalman filter is the estimation part of the optimal control solution to the linear-quadratic-Gaussian control problem.

== The mathematical formalism ==
Consider a probability space (Ω, Σ, P) and suppose that the (random) state Y_{t} in n-dimensional Euclidean space R^{n} of a system of interest at time t is a random variable Y_{t} : Ω → R^{n} given by the solution to an Itō stochastic differential equation of the form

$$\mathrm{d} Y_{t} = b(t, Y_{t}) \, \mathrm{d} t + \sigma (t, Y_{t}) \, \mathrm{d} B_{t},$$

where B denotes standard p-dimensional Brownian motion, b : [0, +∞) × R^{n} → R^{n} is the drift field, and σ : [0, +∞) × R^{n} → R^{n×p} is the diffusion field. It is assumed that observations H_{t} in R^{m} (note that m and n may, in general, be unequal) are taken for each time t according to

$$H_{t} = c(t, Y_{t}) + \gamma (t, Y_{t}) \cdot \mbox{noise}.$$

Adopting the Itō interpretation of the stochastic differential and setting

$$Z_{t} = \int_{0}^{t} H_{s} \, \mathrm{d} s,$$

this gives the following stochastic integral representation for the observations Z_{t}:

$$\mathrm{d} Z_{t} = c(t, Y_{t}) \, \mathrm{d} t + \gamma (t, Y_{t}) \, \mathrm{d} W_{t},$$

where W denotes standard r-dimensional Brownian motion, independent of B and the initial condition Y_{0}, and c : [0, +∞) × R^{n} → R^{n} and γ : [0, +∞) × R^{n} → R^{n×r} satisfy

$$\big| c (t, x) \big| + \big| \gamma (t, x) \big| \leq C \big( 1 + | x | \big)$$

for all t and x and some constant C.

The filtering problem is the following: given observations Z_{s} for 0 ≤ s ≤ t, what is the best estimate Ŷ_{t} of the true state Y_{t} of the system based on those observations?

By "based on those observations" it is meant that Ŷ_{t} is measurable with respect to the σ-algebra G_{t} generated by the observations Z_{s}, 0 ≤ s ≤ t. Denote by K = K(Z, t) the collection of all R^{n}-valued random variables Y that are square-integrable and G_{t}-measurable:

$$K = K(Z, t) = L^{2} (\Omega, G_{t}, \mathbf{P}; \mathbf{R}^{n}).$$

By "best estimate", it is meant that Ŷ_{t} minimizes the mean-square distance between Y_{t} and all candidates in K:

$$\mathbf{E} \left[ \big| Y_{t} - \hat{Y}_{t} \big|^{2} \right] = \inf_{Y \in K} \mathbf{E} \left[ \big| Y_{t} - Y \big|^{2} \right]. \qquad \mbox{(M)}$$

== Basic result: orthogonal projection ==
The space K(Z, t) of candidates is a Hilbert space, and the general theory of Hilbert spaces implies that the solution Ŷ_{t} of the minimization problem (M) is given by

$$\hat{Y}_{t} = P_{K(Z, t)} \big( Y_{t} \big),$$

where P_{K(Z,t)} denotes the orthogonal projection of L^{2}(Ω, Σ, P; R^{n}) onto the linear subspace K(Z, t) = L^{2}(Ω, G_{t}, P; R^{n}). Furthermore, it is a general fact about conditional expectations that if F is any sub-σ-algebra of Σ then the orthogonal projection

$$P_{K} : L^{2} (\Omega, \Sigma, \mathbf{P}; \mathbf{R}^{n}) \to  L^{2} (\Omega, F, \mathbf{P}; \mathbf{R}^{n})$$

is exactly the conditional expectation operator E[·|F], i.e.,

$$P_{K} (X) = \mathbf{E} \big[ X \big | F \big].$$

Hence,

$$\hat{Y}_{t} = P_{K(Z, t)} \big( Y_{t} \big) = \mathbf{E} \big[ Y_{t} \big | G_{t} \big].$$

This elementary result is the basis for the general Fujisaki-Kallianpur-Kunita equation of filtering theory.

== More advanced result: nonlinear filtering SPDE ==
The complete knowledge of the filter at a time t would be given by the probability law of the signal Y_{t} conditional on the sigma-field G_{t} generated by observations Z up to time t. If this probability law admits a density, informally

$$p_t(y)\ dy = {\bf P}(Y_t \in dy|G_t),$$

then under some regularity assumptions the density $p_t(y)$ satisfies a non-linear stochastic partial differential equation (SPDE) driven by $dZ_t$ and called Kushner-Stratonovich equation, or a unnormalized version $q_t(y)$ of the density $p_t(y)$ satisfies a linear SPDE called Zakai equation. These equations can be formulated for the above system, but to simplify the exposition one can assume that the unobserved signal Y and the partially observed noisy signal Z satisfy the equations

$$\mathrm{d} Y_{t} = b(t, Y_{t}) \, \mathrm{d} t + \sigma (t, Y_{t}) \, \mathrm{d} B_{t},$$
$$\mathrm{d} Z_{t} = c(t, Y_{t}) \, \mathrm{d} t +   \mathrm{d} W_{t}.$$

In other terms, the system is simplified by assuming that the observation noise W is not state dependent.

One might keep a deterministic time dependent $\gamma$ in front of $dW$ but we assume this has been taken out by re-scaling.

For this particular system, the Kushner-Stratonovich SPDE for the density $p_t$ reads

$$\mathrm{d} p_t = {\cal L}^*_t  p_t \  dt
+ p_t[c(t,\cdot) - E_{p_t}(c(t,\cdot))]^T [ d Z_t - E_{p_t}(c(t,\cdot)) d t]$$

where T denotes transposition, $E_p$ denotes the expectation with respect to the density p, $E_p[f] = \int f(y) p(y) dy,$ and the forward diffusion operator ${\cal L}^*_t$ is

$${\cal L}_t^* f(t,y) = - \sum_i \frac{\partial}{\partial y_i} [ b_i(t,y) f(t,y) ] + \frac{1}{2} \sum_{i,j} \frac{\partial^2}{\partial y_i \partial y_j} [a_{ij}(t,y) f(t,y)]$$

where $a=\sigma \sigma^T$. If we choose the unnormalized density $q_t(y)$, the Zakai SPDE for the same system reads

$$\mathrm{d} q_t = {\cal L}^*_t  q_t \  dt
+ q_t[c(t,\cdot)]^T  d Z_t .$$

These SPDEs for p and q are written in Ito calculus form. It is possible to write them in Stratonovich calculus form, which turns out to be helpful when deriving filtering approximations based on differential geometry, as in the projection filters. For example, the Kushner-Stratonovich equation written in Stratonovich calculus reads

$$d p_t = {\cal L}^\ast_t\, p_t\,dt
- \frac{1}{2}\, p_t\, [\vert c(\cdot, t) \vert^2 - E_{p_t}(\vert c(\cdot, t) \vert^2)] \,dt
+  p_t\, [c(\cdot, t)-E_{p_t}(c(\cdot, t)) ]^T \circ dZ_t\ .$$

From any of the densities p and q one can calculate all statistics of the signal Y_{t} conditional on the sigma-field generated by observations Z up to time t, so that the densities give complete knowledge of the filter. Under the particular linear-constant assumptions with respect to Y, where the systems coefficients b and c are linear functions of Y and where $\sigma$ and $\gamma$ do not depend on Y, with the initial condition for the signal Y being Gaussian or deterministic, the density $p_t(y)$ is Gaussian and it can be characterized by its mean and variance-covariance matrix, whose evolution is described by the Kalman-Bucy filter, which is finite dimensional. More generally, the evolution of the filter density occurs in an infinite-dimensional function space, and it has to be approximated via a finite dimensional approximation, as hinted above.

== See also ==
- The smoothing problem, closely related to the filtering problem
- Filter (signal processing)
- Kalman filter, a well-known filtering algorithm for linear systems, related both to the filtering problem and the smoothing problem
- Extended Kalman filter, an extension of the Kalman filter to nonlinear systems
- Smoothing
- Projection filters
- Particle filters
- Data assimilation, a class of methods closely related (and often identical) to filtering.
