= Innovation (signal processing) =

Difference of forecasted and actual values

In time series analysis (or forecasting) — as conducted in statistics, signal processing, and many other fields — the innovation is the difference between the observed value of a variable at time t and the optimal forecast of that value based on information available prior to time t. If the forecasting method is working correctly, successive innovations are uncorrelated with each other, i.e., constitute a white noise time series. Thus it can be said that the innovation time series is obtained from the measurement time series by a process of 'whitening', or removing the predictable component. The use of the term innovation in the sense described here is due to Hendrik Bode and Claude Shannon (1950) in their discussion of the Wiener filter problem, although the notion was already implicit in the work of Kolmogorov.

In contrast, the residual is the difference between the observed value of a variable at time t and the optimal updated state of that value based on information available till (including) time t.

== See also ==
- Kalman filter
- Filtering problem (stochastic processes)
- Errors and residuals in statistics
