= David Nualart =

Spanish mathematician

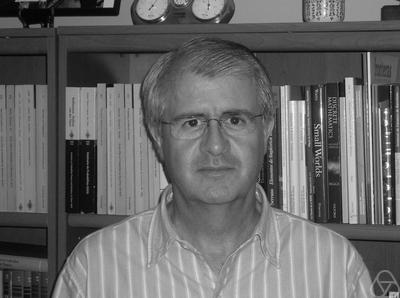
- Born: March 21, 1951
- Education: University of Barcelona
- Scientific career
- Fields: mathematics
- Thesis: Contribución al estudio de la integral estocástica (1975)

David Nualart (born 21 March 1951) is a Spanish mathematician working in the field of probability theory, in particular on aspects of stochastic processes and stochastic analysis. He is retired as Black-Babcock Distinguished Professor of Mathematics at the University of Kansas.

== Education and career ==
Nualart obtained his PhD titled "Contribución al estudio de la integral estocástica" in 1975 at the University of Barcelona under the supervision of Francesc d'Assís Sales Vallès. After positions at the University of Barcelona and the Polytechnique University of Barcelona he took up a professorship at the University of Kansas and was the Black-Babcock Distinguished Professor in its Mathematics Department from 2012 to 2022. He retired in 2022.

He was the Chief Editor of Electronic Communications in Probability from 2006 to 2008.

== Recognition ==
He has been elected a Fellow of the Institute of Mathematical Statistics in 1997. He received a Doctor Honoris Causa by the Université Blaise Pascal of Clermond-Ferrand in 1998. He received the Prize IBERDROLA de Ciencia y Tecnologia in 1999. He has been a Corresponding Member of the Real Academia de Ciencias Exactas Fisicas y Naturales of Madrid since 2003. He has been a member of the Reial Academia de Ciencies i Arts of Barcelona since 2003. He received the Research Prize of the Real Academia de Ciencias de Madrid in 1991.

In March 2011 the International Conference on Malliavin Calculus and Stochastic Analysis in honor of David Nualart took place at University of Kansas. The results were published in 2013 as a festschrift, Malliavin Calculus and Stochastic Analysis: A Festschrift in Honor of David Nualart.

He was named to the 2023 class of Fellows of the American Mathematical Society, "for contributions to Malliavin calculus, stochastic PDE's, and fractional Brownian motion".
