= Harold J. Kushner =

American applied mathematician

- Citizenship: American
- Awards: Richard E. Bellman Control Heritage Award (2004); Louis E. Levy Medal (1994)
- Scientific career
- Fields: Control theory

Harold Joseph Kushner is an American applied mathematician and a Professor Emeritus of Applied Mathematics at Brown University. He is known for his work on the theory of stochastic stability (based on the concept of supermartingales as Lyapunov functions), the theory of non-linear filtering (based on the Kushner equation), and for the development of numerical methods for stochastic control problems such as the Markov chain approximation method. He is commonly cited as the first person to study Bayesian optimization, based on work he published in 1964.

Harold Kushner received his Ph.D. in Electrical Engineering from the University of Wisconsin in 1958.

== Awards and honors ==
- In 1992 the IEEE Control Systems Award
- In 1994 the Louis E. Levy Medal from The Franklin Institute
- In 2004 the Richard E. Bellman Control Heritage Award from the American Automatic Control Council, for "fundamental contributions to stochastic systems theory and engineering applications, and for inspiring generations of researchers in the field"

== Bibliography ==
- Kushner, H. J.; Yin, G. G. (1997). Stochastic Approximation Algorithms and Applications. doi:10.1007/978-1-4899-2696-8. ISBN 978-1-4899-2698-2. S2CID 125672439.
