= Stochastic partial differential equation =

Partial differential equations with random force terms and coefficients

In mathematics, stochastic partial differential equations (SPDEs) are a generalization of partial differential equations via random force terms and coefficients, in the same way ordinary stochastic differential equations generalize ordinary differential equations.

SPDEs arise in quantum field theory, statistical mechanics, spatial modeling, and mathematical finance.

== Examples ==
One of the most studied SPDEs is the stochastic heat equation, which may formally be written as

$$\partial_t u = \Delta u + \xi\;,$$

where $\Delta$ is the Laplacian and $\xi$ denotes space-time white noise. Other examples also include stochastic versions of famous linear equations, such as the wave equation and the Schrödinger equation.

== Discussion ==
One difficulty is their lack of regularity. In one dimensional space, solutions to the stochastic heat equation are only almost 1/2-Hölder continuous in space and 1/4-Hölder continuous in time. For dimensions two and higher, solutions are not even function-valued, but can be made sense of as random distributions.

For linear equations, one can usually find a mild solution via semigroup techniques.

However, problems start to appear when considering non-linear equations. For example

$$\partial_t u = \Delta u + P(u) + \xi,$$

where $P$ is a polynomial. In this case it is not even clear how one should make sense of the equation. Such an equation will also not have a function-valued solution in dimension larger than one, and hence no pointwise meaning. It is well known that the space of distributions has no product structure. This is the core problem of such a theory. This leads to the need of some form of renormalization.

An early attempt to circumvent such problems for some specific equations was the so called da Prato–Debussche trick which involved studying such non-linear equations as perturbations of linear ones. However, this can only be used in very restrictive settings, as it depends on both the non-linear factor and on the regularity of the driving noise term. In recent years, the field has drastically expanded, and now there exists a large machinery to guarantee local existence for a variety of sub-critical SPDEs.

== See also ==
- Brownian surface
- Kardar–Parisi–Zhang equation
- Kushner equation
- Malliavin calculus
- Polynomial chaos
- Wick product
- Zakai equation
- Bain, Alan; Crisan, Dan (2009). Fundamentals of Stochastic Filtering. Stochastic Modelling and Applied Probability. Vol. 60. New York: Springer. ISBN 978-0-387-76895-3.
- Holden, Helge; Øksendal, Bernt; Ubøe, Jan; Zhang, Tusheng (2010) [1996]. Stochastic Partial Differential Equations: A Modeling, White Noise Functional Approach. Universitext (2nd ed.). New York: Springer. ISBN 978-0-387-89487-4.
- Lindgren, Finn; Rue, Håvard; Lindström, Johan (2011). "An explicit link between Gaussian fields and Gaussian Markov random fields: the stochastic partial differential equation approach". Journal of the Royal Statistical Society. B: Statistical Methodology. 73 (4): 423–498. doi:10.1111/j.1467-9868.2011.00777.x.
- Xiu, Dongbin (2010). Numerical Methods for Stochastic Computations: A Spectral Method Approach. Princeton University Press. ISBN 978-0-691-14212-8.
