= Stanley F. Schmidt =

American aerospace engineer (1926–2015)

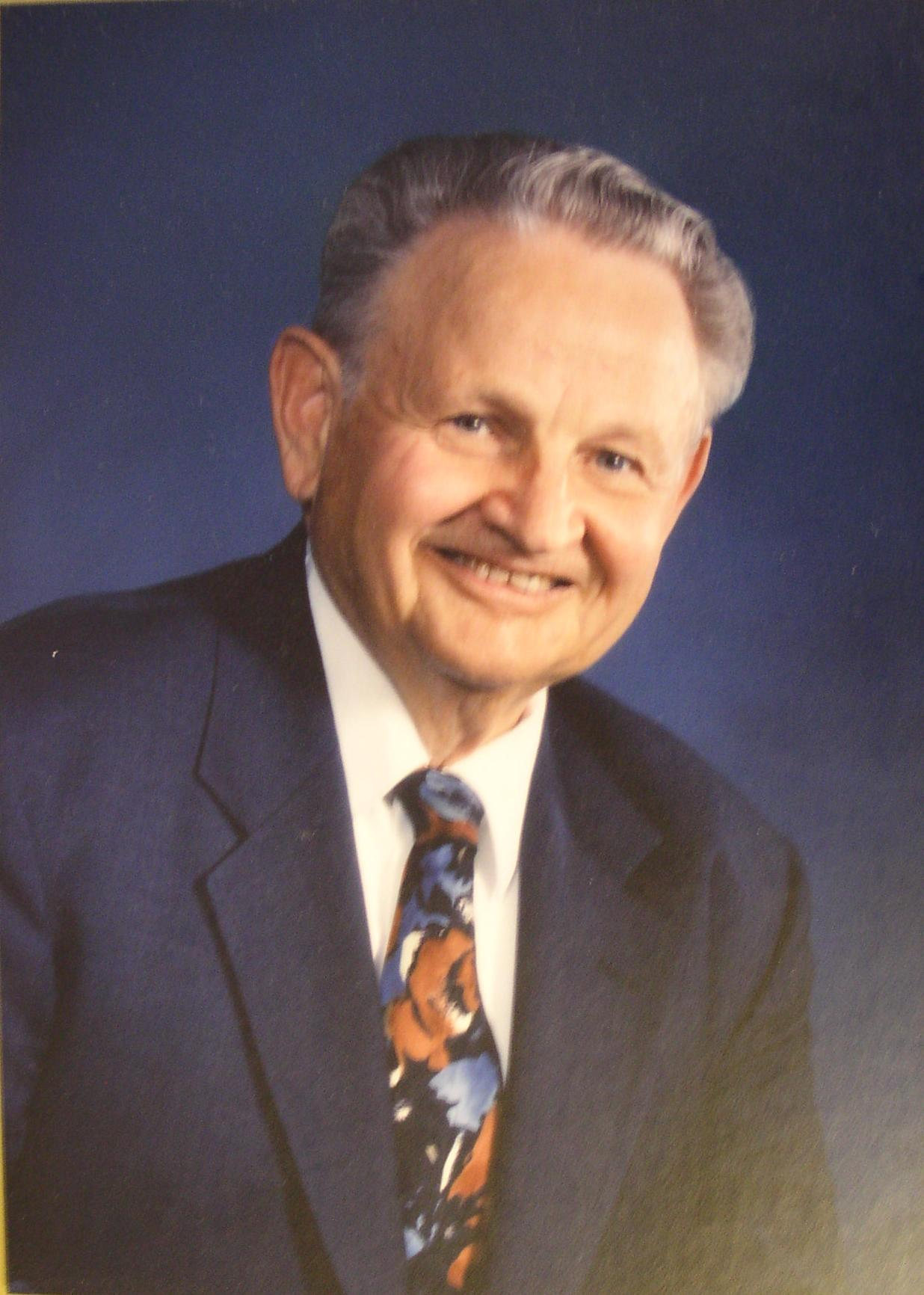

Stanley F. Schmidt (January 21, 1926 – August 13, 2015) was an American aerospace engineer who pioneered the Schmidt-Kalman filter used in air and space navigation, most notably in Apollo spacecraft.

== Early life and education ==
Schmidt was born on January 21, 1926, in Hollister, California, to Fred and Edith Schmidt. He married Meredith Hallenbeck in 1949.

Schmidt began his training in engineering in 1944 in the Navy Air Corps. He received the B.E.E. degree from Marquette University in 1946, and M.S. and Ph.D. degrees in electrical engineering from Stanford University in 1952 and 1959, respectively.

== Career ==
From 1946 to 1961, Schmidt worked with NASA Ames Research Center, where he discovered the utility of the Kalman filter as applied to data processing for the nonlinear navigation equations of the Apollo crewed lunar missions. While at Ames, he developed piloted motion simulators, designed nonlinear compensation techniques for saturation effects in control systems, and served as branch chief in charge of all analog simulation work. During 1961 and 1962, Schmidt was with Lockheed Missiles and Space Company, applying filter theory and model identification techniques and developing digital computer programs to process tracking data and give postflight evaluation of launch vehicle guidance and propulsion systems.

From 1962 to 1966, Schmidt was a senior staff scientist with Philco's Western Development Laboratory. There he directed studies of navigation and guidance systems for space vehicle systems and development of digital computer programs for analysis and design of space vehicle systems. Also at Philco, he conceived the fan beam navigation satellite technique and pursued studies to prove the feasibility and accuracy of this concept. He also developed a formulation of the Kalman filter which was named the Schmidt–Kalman filter in his honor.

In 1966, Schmidt joined Analytical Mechanics Associates, Inc., where he was vice president and technical director of their western division. At AMA, Schmidt developed a special Kalman filter formulation for a navigation system, applied control theory to improve NASA piloted flight simulators, and developed several on-board navigation systems which incorporate square-root formulations of the Kalman filter.

As a consultant to Northrop from 1992-2001, he led a team in the first aircraft application of a Kalman filter for the C-5A navigation system. Continuing to consult to Northrop, he led the design of the Kalman filter for the navigation system in the B-2 bomber.

== Organizations ==
- Associate Fellow, American Institute of Aeronautics and Astronautics
- Member, Eta Kappa Nu
- Member, Institute of Electrical and Electronics Engineers
- Member, Tau Beta Pi

== See also ==
- Extended Kalman filter
