= Schmidt–Kalman filter =

The Schmidt–Kalman Filter is a modification of the Kalman filter for reducing the dimensionality of the state estimate, while still considering the effects of the additional state in the calculation of the covariance matrix and the Kalman gains. A common application is to account for the effects of nuisance parameters such as sensor biases without increasing the dimensionality of the state estimate. This ensures that the covariance matrix will accurately represent the distribution of the errors.

The primary advantage of utilizing the Schmidt–Kalman filter instead of increasing the dimensionality of the state space is the reduction in computational complexity. This can enable the use of filtering in real-time systems. Another usage of Schmidt–Kalman is when residual biases are unobservable; that is, the effect of the bias cannot be separated out from the measurement. In this case, Schmidt–Kalman is a robust way to not try and estimate the value of the bias, but only keep track of the effect of the bias on the true error distribution.

For use in non-linear systems, the observation and state transition models may be linearized around the current mean and covariance estimate in a method analogous to the extended Kalman filter.

== Naming and historical development ==
Stanley F. Schmidt developed the Schmidt–Kalman filter as a method to account for unobservable biases while maintaining the low dimensionality required for implementation in real time systems.

== See also ==
- Kalman filter
- Extended Kalman filter
