= Linear dynamical system =

Type of mathematical system

Linear dynamical systems are dynamical systems whose evolution functions are linear. While dynamical systems, in general, do not have closed-form solutions, linear dynamical systems can be solved exactly, and they have a rich set of mathematical properties. Linear systems can also be used to understand the qualitative behavior of general dynamical systems, by calculating the equilibrium points of the system and approximating it as a linear system around each such point.

== Introduction ==
In a linear dynamical system, the variation of a state vector (an $N$-dimensional vector denoted $\mathbf{x}$) equals a constant matrix (denoted $\mathbf{A}$) multiplied by $\mathbf{x}$. This variation can take two forms: either as a flow, in which $\mathbf{x}$ varies continuously with time

$$\frac{d}{dt} \mathbf{x}(t) = \mathbf{A} \mathbf{x}(t)$$

or as a mapping, in which $\mathbf{x}$ varies in discrete steps

$$\mathbf{x}_{m+1} = \mathbf{A} \mathbf{x}_{m}$$

These equations are linear in the following sense: if $\mathbf{x}(t)$ and $\mathbf{y}(t)$ are two valid solutions, then so is any linear combination of the two solutions, e.g., $\mathbf{z}(t) \ \stackrel{\mathrm{def}}{=}\ \alpha \mathbf{x}(t) + \beta \mathbf{y}(t)$ where $\alpha$ and $\beta$ are any two scalars. The matrix $\mathbf{A}$ need not be symmetric.

Linear dynamical systems can be solved exactly, in contrast to most nonlinear ones. Occasionally, a nonlinear system can be solved exactly by a change of variables to a linear system. Moreover, the solutions of (almost) any nonlinear system can be well-approximated by an equivalent linear system near its fixed points. Hence, understanding linear systems and their solutions is a crucial first step to understanding the more complex nonlinear systems.

== Solution of linear dynamical systems ==
If the initial vector $\mathbf{x}_{0} \ \stackrel{\mathrm{def}}{=}\ \mathbf{x}(t=0)$ is aligned with a right eigenvector $\mathbf{r}_{k}$ of the matrix $\mathbf{A}$, the dynamics are simple

$$\frac{d}{dt} \mathbf{x}(t) =
\mathbf{A} \mathbf{r}_{k} = \lambda_{k} \mathbf{r}_{k}$$

where $\lambda_{k}$ is the corresponding eigenvalue; the solution of this equation is

$$\mathbf{x}(t) =
\mathbf{r}_{k} e^{\lambda_{k} t}$$

as may be confirmed by substitution.

If $\mathbf{A}$ is diagonalizable, then any vector in an $N$-dimensional space can be represented by a linear combination of the right and left eigenvectors (denoted $\mathbf{l}_{k}$) of the matrix $\mathbf{A}$.

$$\mathbf{x}_{0} =
\sum_{k=1}^{N}
\left( \mathbf{l}_{k} \cdot \mathbf{x}_{0} \right)
\mathbf{r}_{k}$$

Therefore, the general solution for $\mathbf{x}(t)$ is a linear combination of the individual solutions for the right eigenvectors

$$\mathbf{x}(t) =
\sum_{k=1}^{n}
\left( \mathbf{l}_{k} \cdot \mathbf{x}_{0} \right)
\mathbf{r}_{k} e^{\lambda_{k} t}$$

Similar considerations apply to the discrete mappings.

== Classification in two dimensions ==
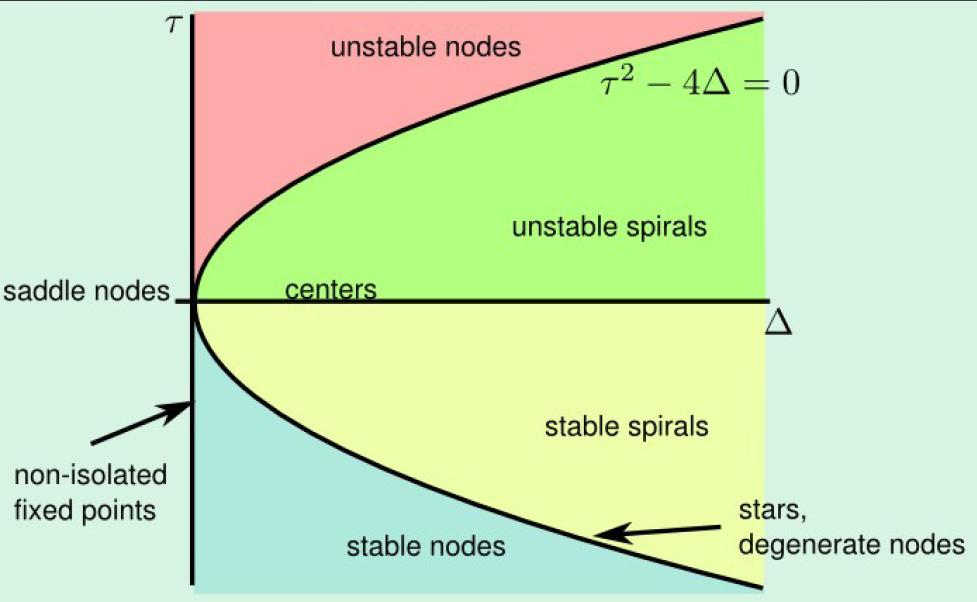
Linear approximation of a nonlinear system: classification of 2D fixed point according to the trace and the determinant of the Jacobian matrix (the linearization of the system near an equilibrium point).

The roots of the characteristic polynomial det(A - λI) are the eigenvalues of A. The sign and relation of these roots, $\lambda_n$, to each other may be used to determine the stability of the dynamical system

$$\frac{d}{dt} \mathbf{x}(t) = \mathbf{A} \mathbf{x}(t).$$

For a 2-dimensional system, the characteristic polynomial is of the form $\lambda^2-\tau\lambda+\Delta=0$ where $\tau$ is the trace and $\Delta$ is the determinant of A. Thus the two roots are in the form:

$$\lambda_1=\frac{\tau+\sqrt{\tau^2-4\Delta}}{2}$$
$$\lambda_2=\frac{\tau-\sqrt{\tau^2-4\Delta}}{2}$$,

and $\Delta=\lambda_1\lambda_2$ and $\tau=\lambda_1+\lambda_2$. Thus if $\Delta<0$ then the eigenvalues are of opposite sign, and the fixed point is a saddle. If $\Delta>0$ then the eigenvalues are of the same sign. Therefore, if $\tau>0$ both are positive and the point is unstable, and if $\tau<0$ then both are negative and the point is stable. The discriminant will tell you if the point is nodal or spiral (i.e. if the eigenvalues are real or complex).

== See also ==
- Linear system
- Dynamical system
- List of dynamical system topics
- Matrix differential equation
