= Rudolf E. Kálmán =

Hungarian-American mathematician (1930–2016)

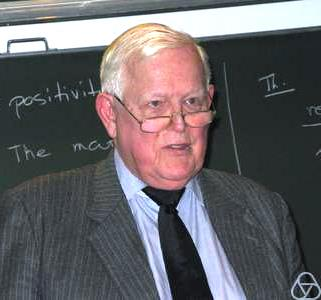
- Born: Rudolf Emil Kálmán; May 19, 1930; Budapest, Hungary
- Died: July 2, 2016 (aged 86); Gainesville, Florida
- Citizenship: Hungary; United States
- Education: Massachusetts Institute of Technology; Columbia University
- Known for: Kalman filter Kalman problem Kalman decomposition Kalman–Yakubovich–Popov lemma Observability; State-space representation
- Awards: IEEE Medal of Honor (1974); Rufus Oldenburger Medal (1976); Kyoto Prize (1985); Richard E. Bellman Control Heritage Award (1997); Charles Stark Draper Prize (2008); National Medal of Science (2009)
- Scientific career
- Fields: Electrical Engineering; Mathematics; Applied Engineering Systems Theory
- Workplaces: Stanford University; University of Florida; Swiss Federal Institute of Technology
- Doctoral advisor: John Ragazzini
- Doctoral students: Pramod P. Khargonekar; Eduardo D. Sontag; Anthony Tether; Tryphon T. Georgiou

Rudolf Emil Kálmán (May 19, 1930 – July 2, 2016) was a Hungarian-American electrical engineer, mathematician, and inventor. He is most noted for his co-invention and development of the Kalman filter, a mathematical algorithm that is widely used in signal processing, control systems, and guidance, navigation and control. For this work, U.S. President Barack Obama awarded Kálmán the National Medal of Science on October 7, 2009.

== Life and career ==
Rudolf Kálmán was born in Budapest, Hungary, in 1930 to Otto and Ursula Kálmán (née Grundmann). After emigrating to the United States in 1943, he earned his bachelor's degree in 1953 and his master's degree in 1954, both from the Massachusetts Institute of Technology, in electrical engineering. Kálmán completed his doctorate in 1957 at Columbia University in New York City.

Kálmán worked as a Research Mathematician at the Research Institute for Advanced Studies in Baltimore, Maryland, from 1958 until 1964. He was a professor at Stanford University from 1964 until 1971, and then a Graduate Research Professor and the Director of the Center for Mathematical System Theory, at the University of Florida from 1971 until 1992. He periodically returned to Fontainebleau from 1969 to 1972 at MINES ParisTech where he served as scientific advisor for Centre de recherches en automatique. Starting in 1973, he also held the chair of Mathematical System Theory at the Swiss Federal Institute of Technology in Zurich, Switzerland.

Kálmán died on the morning of July 2, 2016, at his home in Gainesville, Florida.

== Work ==
Kálmán was an electrical engineer by his undergraduate and graduate education at MIT and Columbia University, and he was noted for his co-invention of the Kalman filter (or Kalman-Bucy Filter), which is a mathematical technique widely used in the digital computers of control systems, navigation systems, avionics, and outer-space vehicles to extract a signal from a long sequence of noisy or incomplete measurements, usually those done by electronic and gyroscopic systems.

Kálmán's ideas on filtering were initially met with vast skepticism, so much so that he was forced to do the first publication of his results in mechanical engineering, rather than in electrical engineering or systems engineering. Kálmán had more success in presenting his ideas, however, while visiting Stanley F. Schmidt at the NASA Ames Research Center in 1960. This led to the use of Kálmán filters during the Apollo program, and furthermore, in the NASA Space Shuttle, in Navy submarines, and in unmanned aerospace vehicles and weapons, such as cruise missiles.

Kálmán published several seminal papers during the sixties, which rigorously established what is now known as the state-space representation of dynamical systems. He introduced the formal definition of a system, the notions of controllability and observability, eventually leading to the Kalman decomposition. Kálmán also gave groundbreaking contributions to the theory of optimal control and provided, in his joint work with J. E. Bertram, a comprehensive and insightful exposure of stability theory for dynamical systems. He also worked with B. L. Ho on the minimal realization problem, providing the well known Ho-Kalman algorithm.

== Awards and honors ==
Kálmán was a foreign member of the French, Hungarian and Russian Academies of Sciences, as well as a member of the National Academy of Sciences, the National Academy of Engineering, and the American Academy of Arts and Sciences. He has been awarded many honorary doctorates from other universities. In 2012 he became a fellow of the American Mathematical Society.

Kálmán received the IEEE Medal of Honor in 1974, the IEEE Centennial Medal in 1984, the Inamori foundation's Kyoto Prize in Advanced Technology in 1985, the Steele Prize of the American Mathematical Society in 1987, the Richard E. Bellman Control Heritage Award in 1997, and the National Academy of Engineering's Charles Stark Draper Prize in 2008.

Kálmán also received an Honorary Doctorate from Heriot-Watt University in 1990. and an Honorary doctorate from the Politecnico di Milano in 2012. Kalman died a few weeks before the conferment of the latter doctorate, so that his wife Dina attended the ceremony on his behalf, held in the Conference room of the Departement of Electronics, Information and Bioengineering of the Politecnico di Milano on 12 September 2016.

== See also ==
- List of members of the National Academy of Engineering (Electronics)

== Selected publications ==
- Kalman, R.E. (1960). "A New Approach to Linear Filtering and Prediction Problems". Journal of Basic Engineering. 82 (1): 35–45. doi:10.1115/1.3662552. S2CID 1242324.
- Kalman, R.E.; Bucy, R.S. (1961). "New Results in Linear Filtering and Prediction Theory" (PDF). Journal of Basic Engineering. 83: 95–108. doi:10.1115/1.3658902. S2CID 8141345.
- Kalman, R. E. (1960). "Contributions to the theory of optimal control". Bol. Soc. Mat. Mexicana.
- Kalman, R. E. (1963). "Mathematical description of linear dynamical systems". Journal of the Society for Industrial and Applied Mathematics. 1 (2): 152–192. doi:10.1137/0301010.
- Kalman, R. E.; Bertram, J. E. (1960). "Control system analysis and design Via the "second method" of Lyapunov: I — Continuous-time systems". Journal of Basic Engineering.
- Kalman, R. E.; Bertram, J. E. (1960). "Control system analysis and design Via the "second method" of Lyapunov: II — Discrete-time systems". Journal of Basic Engineering.
- Kalman, R. E.; Ho, B. L. (1966). "Editorial: Effective construction of linear state-variable models from input/output functions". Regelungstechnik.

== See also ==
- Hamilton–Jacobi–Bellman equation
