= Rosenbrock system matrix =

In applied mathematics, the Rosenbrock system matrix or Rosenbrock's system matrix of a linear time-invariant system is a useful representation bridging state-space representation and transfer function matrix form. It was proposed in 1967 by Howard H. Rosenbrock.

== Definition ==
Consider the dynamic system
$$\begin{align}
\dot{x} &= Ax +Bu, \\
y &= Cx +Du.
\end{align}$$
The Rosenbrock system matrix is given by
$$P(s) = \begin{pmatrix}
sI-A & -B\\
C  & D
\end{pmatrix}.$$
In the original work by Rosenbrock, the constant matrix $D$ is allowed to be a polynomial in $s$.

The transfer function between the input $i$ and output $j$ is given by
$$g_{ij}=\frac{\begin{vmatrix}
sI-A & -b_i\\
c_j  & d_{ij}
\end{vmatrix}}{|sI-A|}$$
where $b_i$ is the column $i$ of $B$ and $c_j$ is the row $j$ of $C$.

Based in this representation, Rosenbrock developed his version of the PBH test.

== Short form ==
For computational purposes, a short form of the Rosenbrock system matrix is more appropriate and given by
$$P\sim\begin{pmatrix} A & B \\ C & D \end{pmatrix}.$$
The short form of the Rosenbrock system matrix has been widely used in H-infinity methods in control theory, where it is also referred to as packed form; see command pck in MATLAB. An interpretation of the Rosenbrock System Matrix as a Linear Fractional Transformation can be found in.

One of the first applications of the Rosenbrock form was the development of an efficient computational method for Kalman decomposition, which is based on the pivot element method. A variant of Rosenbrock’s method is implemented in the minreal command of Matlab and GNU Octave.
