= Negative imaginary systems =

Negative imaginary (NI) systems theory was introduced by Lanzon and Petersen in. A generalization of the theory was presented in In the single-input single-output (SISO) case, such systems are defined by considering the properties of the imaginary part of the frequency response G(jω) and require the system to have no poles in the right half plane and $j(G(j\omega )-G(j\omega )^{\ast })$ > 0 for all ω in (0, ∞). This means that a system is Negative imaginary if it is both stable and a nyquist plot will have a phase lag between [-π 0] for all ω > 0.

== Negative Imaginary Definition ==
A square transfer function matrix $G(s)$ is NI if the following conditions are satisfied:

1. $G(s)$ has no pole in $Re[s]>0$.
2. For all $\omega \geq0$ such that $j\omega$ is not a pole of $G(s)$ and $j\left( G(j\omega )-G(j\omega )^{\ast }\right) \geq 0$.
3. If $s=j\omega _{0}, \omega _{0}>0$ is a pole of $G(s)$, then it is a simple pole and furthermore, the residual matrix $K = \lim_{s\to j\omega _{0}} (s-j\omega _{0}) jG(s)$ is Hermitian and positive semidefinite.
4. If $s=0$ is a pole of $G(s)$, then $\lim_{s\to 0} s^{k}G(s)=0$ for all $k\geq3$ and $\lim_{s\to 0} s^{2}G(s)$ is Hermitian and positive semidefinite.

These conditions can be summarized as:

1. The system $G(s)$ is stable.
2. For all positive frequencies, the nyquist diagram of the system response is between [-π 0].

== Negative Imaginary Lemma ==
Let
$$\begin{bmatrix}
\begin{array}{c|c}
A & B \\ \hline C & D
\end{array}
\end{bmatrix}$$
be a minimal realization of the transfer function matrix $G(s)$. Then, $G(s)$ is NI if and only if $D=D^T$ and there exists a matrix

$P=P^{T}\geq 0, \text { } W\in \mathbb{R}^{m \times m}, \text {and } L\in \mathbb{R}^{m \times n}$ such that the following LMI is satisfied:

$$\begin{bmatrix}
PA+A^{T}P & PB-A^{T}C^{T} \\
B^{T}P-CA & -(CB+B^{T}C^{T})
\end{bmatrix}
=
\begin{bmatrix}
-L^{T}L & -L^{T}W \\
-W^{T}L & -W^{T}W
\end{bmatrix}
\leq 0.$$

This result comes from positive real theory after converting the negative imaginary system to a positive real system for analysis.
