= Ian R. Petersen =

Australian control theorist (born 1956)

- Born: Ian Richard Petersen; 1956 (age 69–70); Australia
- Education: University of Melbourne; University of Rochester
- Known for: Quantum feedback, H-infinity control, Negative imaginary systems
- Awards: Fellow of the IEEE; Fellow of the Australian Academy of Science
- Scientific career
- Fields: Control theory, Quantum control
- Workplaces: Australian National University

Ian Richard Petersen (born 1956) is an Australian control theorist known for his contributions to robust control, quantum control, and stochastic systems. He has worked on the theoretical foundations of quantum feedback, risk-sensitive and H-infinity control, as well as frameworks for the analysis of negative imaginary systems. He is particularly known for his work in H-infinity control, and is regarded as one of the pioneers in the field of quantum control theory. He is a professor at the Australian National University (ANU), affiliated with the Research School of Engineering.

Petersen is one of the researchers who introduced the concept of negative imaginary systems, providing a theoretical foundation for their analysis and control.

== Education and career ==
Petersen received his Bachelor of Engineering (First Class Honours) in Electrical Engineering from the University of Melbourne in 1979. He later earned his M.Sc. and Ph.D. degrees in Electrical Engineering from the University of Rochester, United States, completing his doctorate in 1984. His doctoral studies were supported by a Fulbright Postgraduate Scholarship.

From 1985 to 2016, he held various academic positions at the University of New South Wales (UNSW), including Scientia Professor, Australian Laureate Fellow, and Acting Deputy Vice-Chancellor (Research). He joined the Australian National University in 2017.

He has held visiting fellowships at institutions including Caltech, the University of Tokyo, and the University of Cambridge.

== Awards and honors ==
- Fellow of the Institute of Electrical and Electronics Engineers (IEEE)
- Fellow of the Australian Academy of Science
- Fellow of the International Federation of Automatic Control (IFAC)
- Fellow of the Institution of Engineers Australia
- Member of the Society for Industrial and Applied Mathematics (SIAM)
- Senior Member of the American Institute of Aeronautics and Astronautics (AIAA)
- Recipient of the Chinese Academy of Sciences President's International Fellowship in 2015
- Awarded Best Paper at the 11th World Congress on Intelligent Control and Automation in 2014, jointly with Guodong Shi, Karl Henrik Johansson, and Daoyi Dong
- Recognized as an ISI Highly Cited Researcher in Engineering
- Served as a Visiting Fellow at Corpus Christi College, University of Cambridge, in 1998
- Held the position of Fellow Commoner at Churchill College, Cambridge, in 1989
- Awarded the Fulbright Postgraduate Scholarship from 1979 to 1983
