= Taylor Booth =

Taylor Booth may refer to:

- Taylor Booth (mathematician) (1933–1986), American mathematician
- Taylor Booth (soccer) (born 2001), American soccer player
