= Minimal realization =

In control theory, given any transfer function, any state-space model that is both controllable and observable and has the same input-output behaviour as the transfer function is said to be a minimal realization of the transfer function. The realization is called "minimal" because it describes the system with the minimum number of states.

The minimum number of state variables required to describe a system equals the order of the differential equation; more state variables than the minimum can be defined. For example, a second order system can be defined by two or more state variables, with two being the minimal realization.

== Gilbert's realization ==
Given a matrix transfer function, it is possible to directly construct a minimal state-space realization by using Gilbert's method (also known as Gilbert's realization).
