= Marginal stability =

Dynamical system which is neither asymptotically stable nor unstable

In the theory of dynamical systems and control theory, a linear time-invariant system is marginally stable if it is neither asymptotically stable nor unstable. Roughly speaking, a system is stable if it always returns to and stays near a particular state (called the steady state), and is unstable if it goes further and further away from any state, without being bounded. A marginal system, sometimes referred to as having neutral stability, is between these two types: when displaced, it does not return to near a common steady state, nor does it go away from where it started without limit.

Marginal stability, like instability, is a feature that control theory seeks to avoid; we wish that, when perturbed by some external force, a system will return to a desired state. This necessitates the use of appropriately designed control algorithms.

In econometrics, the presence of a unit root in observed time series, rendering them marginally stable, can lead to invalid regression results regarding effects of the independent variables upon a dependent variable, unless appropriate techniques are used to convert the system to a stable system.

== Continuous time ==
A homogeneous continuous linear time-invariant system is marginally stable if and only if the real part of every pole (eigenvalue) in the system's transfer-function is non-positive, one or more poles have zero real part, and all poles with zero real part are simple roots (i.e. the poles on the imaginary axis are all distinct from one another). In contrast, if all the poles have strictly negative real parts, the system is instead asymptotically stable. If the system is neither stable nor marginally stable, it is unstable.

If the system is in state space representation, marginal stability can be analyzed by deriving the Jordan normal form: if and only if the Jordan blocks corresponding to poles with zero real part are scalar is the system marginally stable.

== Discrete time ==
A homogeneous discrete time linear time-invariant system is marginally stable if and only if the greatest magnitude of any of the poles (eigenvalues) of the transfer function is 1, and the poles with magnitude equal to 1 are all distinct. That is, the transfer function's spectral radius is 1. If the spectral radius is less than 1, the system is instead asymptotically stable.

A simple example involves a single first-order linear difference equation: Suppose a state variable x evolves according to

$$x_t=ax_{t-1}$$

with parameter a > 0. If the system is perturbed to the value $x_0,$ its subsequent sequence of values is $ax_0, \, a^2x_0, \, a^3x_0, \, \dots .$ If a < 1, these numbers get closer and closer to 0 regardless of the starting value $x_0,$ while if a > 1 the numbers get larger and larger without bound. But if a = 1, the numbers do neither of these: instead, all future values of x equal the value $x_0.$ Thus the case a = 1 exhibits marginal stability.

== System response ==
A marginally stable system is one that, if given an impulse of finite magnitude as input, will not "blow up" and give an unbounded output, but neither will the output return to zero. A bounded offset or oscillations in the output will persist indefinitely, and so there will in general be no final steady-state output. If a continuous system is given an input at a frequency equal to the frequency of a pole with zero real part, the system's output will increase indefinitely (this is known as pure resonance). This explains why for a system to be BIBO stable, the real parts of the poles have to be strictly negative (and not just non-positive).

A continuous system having imaginary poles, i.e. having zero real part in the pole(s), will produce sustained oscillations in the output. For example, an undamped second-order system such as the suspension system in an automobile (a mass–spring–damper system), from which the damper has been removed and spring is ideal, i.e. no friction is there, will in theory oscillate forever once disturbed. Another example is a frictionless pendulum. A system with a pole at the origin is also marginally stable but in this case there will be no oscillation in the response as the imaginary part is also zero (jw = 0 means w = 0 rad/sec). An example of such a system is a mass on a surface with friction. When a sidewards impulse is applied, the mass will move and never returns to zero. The mass will come to rest due to friction however, and the sidewards movement will remain bounded.

Since the locations of the marginal poles must be exactly on the imaginary axis or unit circle (for continuous time and discrete time systems respectively) for a system to be marginally stable, this situation is unlikely to occur in practice unless marginal stability is an inherent theoretical feature of the system.

== Stochastic dynamics ==
Marginal stability is also an important concept in the context of stochastic dynamics. For example, some processes may follow a random walk, given in discrete time as

$$x_t=x_{t-1}+e_t,$$

where $e_t$ is an i.i.d. error term. This equation has a unit root (a value of 1 for the eigenvalue of its characteristic equation), and hence exhibits marginal stability, so special time series techniques must be used in empirically modeling a system containing such an equation.

Marginally stable Markov processes are those that possess null recurrent classes.

== See also ==
- Lyapunov stability
- Exponential stability
