= Taylor Booth (mathematician) =

American mathematician (1933–1986)

- Born: Taylor Lockwood Booth; September 22, 1933; Manchester, Connecticut, U.S.
- Died: October 20, 1986 (aged 53)
- Education: University of Connecticut
- Known for: Sequential Machines and Automata Theory (1967)
- Awards: IEEE Centennial Medal (1984)
- Scientific career
- Fields: Mathematics, computer science, computer engineering

Taylor Lockwood Booth (September 22, 1933 – October 20, 1986) was a mathematician known for his work in automata theory.

One of his fundamental works is Sequential Machines and Automata Theory (1967). It is a wide-ranging book meant for specialists, written for both theoretical computer scientists as well as electrical engineers. It deals with state minimization techniques, finite-state machines, Turing machines, Markov processes, and undecidability.

== Education ==
Booth studied at the University of Connecticut, where he received his B.S., M.S. and Ph.D. degrees.

== Professional career ==
At his alma mater Booth was professor at the Computer Science and Engineering department.

He was the founder and director of the Computer Applications & Research Center (CARC) at the University of Connecticut's School of Engineering. In 1981 the center was created to support the school's growing need for centralized computing research and development services. After his death the center was renamed to "Taylor L. Booth Center for Computer Applications and Research" or in its shorter form the "Booth Research Center". In 2002 this merged with the Advanced Technology Institute (ATI), another center at the School of Engineering, to form the "Booth Engineering Center for Advanced Technology" (BECAT).

Booth was the first president of the Computing Sciences Accreditation Board, founded in 1984 and since renamed to CSAB.

== Awards and honors ==
Professor Booth received following awards and honors:

- The Frederick Emmons Terman Award from the American Society for Engineering Education in 1972, to recognize the outstanding young electrical engineering educator.
- The IEEE Centennial Medal from the Institute of Electrical and Electronics Engineers (IEEE) in 1984.
- The Distinguished Service Award from the IEEE Computer Society in 1985, for his accreditation work.

=== Taylor L. Booth Education Award ===
After Booth's death, the IEEE Computer Society established the Taylor L. Booth Education Award, to keep his name in memory. The award is given annually for individuals with an "outstanding record in computer science and engineering education".
