= Exponential stability =

Continuous-time linear system with only negative real parts

In control theory, a continuous linear time-invariant system (LTI) is exponentially stable if and only if the system has eigenvalues (i.e., the poles of input-to-output systems) with strictly negative real parts (i.e., in the left half of the complex plane). A discrete-time input-to-output LTI system is exponentially stable if and only if the poles of its transfer function lie strictly within the unit circle centered on the origin of the complex plane. Systems that are not LTI are exponentially stable if their convergence is bounded by exponential decay. Exponential stability is a form of asymptotic stability, valid for more general dynamical systems.

== Definition ==
Consider the system
$$\dot{x} = f(t, x), \ x(t_0) = x_0,$$
where $f$ is piecewise continuous in $t$ and Lipschitz in $x$. Assume without loss of generality that $f$ has an equilibrium at the origin $x=0$. This equilibrium is exponentially stable if there exist $c, k, \lambda > 0$ such that
$$\| x(t) \| \leq k \| x(t_0) \| e^{-\lambda (t - t_0)},$$
for all $\| x(t_0) \| < c$. That is, the solution $x(t)$ displays an exponential rate of decay.

== Practical consequences ==
An exponentially stable LTI system is one that will not "blow up" (i.e., give an unbounded output) when given a finite input or non-zero initial condition. Moreover, if the system is given a fixed, finite input (i.e., a step), then any resulting oscillations in the output will decay at an exponential rate, and the output will tend asymptotically to a new final, steady-state value. If the system is instead given a Dirac delta impulse as input, then induced oscillations will die away and the system will return to its previous value. If oscillations do not die away, or the system does not return to its original output when an impulse is applied, the system is instead marginally stable.

== Example exponentially stable LTI systems ==
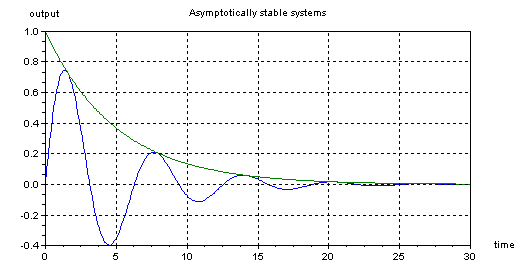
The impulse responses of two exponentially stable systems

The graph on the right shows the impulse response of two similar systems. The green curve is the response of the system with impulse response $y(t) = e^{-\frac{t}{5}}$, while the blue represents the system $y(t) = e^{-\frac{t}{5}}\sin(t)$. Although one response is oscillatory, both return to the original value of 0 over time.

=== Real-world example ===
Imagine putting a marble in a ladle. It will settle itself into the lowest point of the ladle and, unless disturbed, will stay there. Now imagine giving the ball a push, which is an approximation to a Dirac delta impulse. The marble will roll back and forth but eventually resettle in the bottom of the ladle. Drawing the horizontal position of the marble over time would give a gradually diminishing sinusoid rather like the blue curve in the image above.

A step input in this case requires supporting the marble away from the bottom of the ladle, so that it cannot roll back. It will stay in the same position and will not, as would be the case if the system were only marginally stable or entirely unstable, continue to move away from the bottom of the ladle under this constant force equal to its weight.

In this example the system is not stable for all inputs. Give the marble a big enough push, and it will fall out of the ladle and fall, stopping only when it reaches the floor. For some systems, therefore, it is proper to state that a system is exponentially stable over a certain range of inputs.

== See also ==
- Exponentially stable semigroup
- Marginal stability
- State space (controls)
