= CSAB (professional organization) =

US non-profit professional organization

CSAB, Inc., formerly called the Computing Sciences Accreditation Board, Inc., is a non-profit professional organization in the United States, focused on the quality of education in computing disciplines. The Association for Computing Machinery (ACM) and the IEEE Computer Society (IEEE-CS) are the member societies of CSAB. The Association for Information Systems (AIS) was a member society between 2002 and September 2009.

CSAB itself is a member society of ABET, to support the accreditation of several computing-related disciplines:

- It is leading for computer science, information systems, information technology and software engineering
- It is working together with other ABET member societies for computer engineering, information engineering and biological engineering

Who is doing what:

- For the disciplines where CSAB is leading, it develops the accreditation criteria and it educates the so-called Program Evaluators (PEVs).
- But the accreditation activities themselves are conducted by the appropriate ABET accreditation commission. For computing this is the Computing Accreditation Commission (CAC).

== History ==
The Computing Sciences Accreditation Board, Inc. (CSAB) was founded in 1984, with Taylor L. Booth as first president.

Initially, CSAB had its own accreditation commission called the Computer Science Accreditation Commission (CSAC). But in November 1998 CSAB and ABET agreed to integrate CSAB's accreditation activities within ABET. The result is that in 2000 a reorganized CSAB became a member society of ABET and that, starting with the 2001-2002 cycle, a merged and renamed CSAC operates as the fourth commission of ABET: the Computing Accreditation Commission (CAC).
