= Kalman decomposition =

Mathematical Theory

In control theory, a Kalman decomposition provides a mathematical means to convert a representation of any linear time-invariant (LTI) control system to a form in which the system can be decomposed into a standard form which makes clear the observable and controllable components of the system. This decomposition results in the system being presented with a more illuminating structure, making it easier to draw conclusions on the system's reachable and observable subspaces.

== Definition ==
Consider the continuous-time LTI control system

$$\dot{x}(t) = Ax(t) + Bu(t)$$,
$$\, y(t) = Cx(t) + Du(t)$$,

or the discrete-time LTI control system

$$\, x(k+1) = Ax(k) + Bu(k)$$,
$$\, y(k) = Cx(k) + Du(k)$$.

The Kalman decomposition is defined as the realization of this system obtained by transforming the original matrices as follows:

$$\, {\hat{A}} = TA{T}^{-1}$$,
$$\, {\hat{B}} = TB$$,
$$\, {\hat{C}} = C{T}^{-1}$$,
$$\, {\hat{D}} = D$$,

where $\, T^{-1}$ is the coordinate transformation matrix defined as

$$\,  T^{-1} = \begin{bmatrix} T_{r\overline{o}} & T_{ro} & T_{\overline{ro}} & T_{\overline{r}o}\end{bmatrix}$$,

and whose submatrices are

- $\, T_{r\overline{o}}$ : a matrix whose columns span the subspace of states which are both reachable and unobservable.
- $\, T_{ro}$ : chosen so that the columns of
  $$\, \begin{bmatrix} T_{r\overline{o}} & T_{ro}\end{bmatrix}$$
  are a basis for the reachable subspace.
- $\, T_{\overline{ro}}$ : chosen so that the columns of
  $$\, \begin{bmatrix} T_{r\overline{o}} & T_{\overline{ro}}\end{bmatrix}$$
  are a basis for the unobservable subspace.
- $\, T_{\overline{r}o}$ : chosen so that
  $$\,\begin{bmatrix} T_{r\overline{o}} & T_{ro} & T_{\overline{ro}} & T_{\overline{r}o}\end{bmatrix}$$
  is invertible.

It can be observed that some of these matrices may have dimension zero. For example, if the system is both observable and controllable, then $\, T^{-1} = T_{ro}$, making the other matrices zero dimension.

== Consequences ==
By using results from controllability and observability, it can be shown that the transformed system $\, (\hat{A}, \hat{B}, \hat{C}, \hat{D})$ has matrices in the following form:

$$\, \hat{A} = \begin{bmatrix}A_{r\overline{o}} & A_{12} & A_{13} & A_{14} \\
0 & A_{ro} & 0 & A_{24} \\
0 & 0 & A_{\overline{ro}} & A_{34}\\
0 & 0 & 0 & A_{\overline{r}o}\end{bmatrix}$$

$$\, \hat{B} = \begin{bmatrix}B_{r\overline{o}} \\ B_{ro} \\ 0 \\ 0\end{bmatrix}$$

$$\, \hat{C} = \begin{bmatrix}0 & C_{ro} & 0 & C_{\overline{r}o}\end{bmatrix}$$

$$\, \hat{D} = D$$

This leads to the conclusion that

- The subsystem $\, (A_{ro}, B_{ro}, C_{ro}, D)$ is both reachable and observable.
- The subsystem
  $$\, \left(\begin{bmatrix}A_{r\overline{o}} & A_{12}\\ 0 & A_{ro}\end{bmatrix},\begin{bmatrix}B_{r\overline{o}} \\ B_{ro}\end{bmatrix},\begin{bmatrix}0 & C_{ro}\end{bmatrix}, D\right)$$
  is reachable.
- The subsystem
  $$\, \left(\begin{bmatrix}A_{ro} & A_{24}\\ 0 & A_{\overline{r}o}\end{bmatrix},\begin{bmatrix}B_{ro} \\ 0 \end{bmatrix},\begin{bmatrix}C_{ro} & C_{\overline{r}o}\end{bmatrix}, D\right)$$
  is observable.

== Variants ==
A Kalman decomposition also exists for linear dynamical quantum systems. Unlike classical dynamical systems, the coordinate transformation used in this variant requires to be in a specific class of transformations due to the physical laws of quantum mechanics.

== See also ==
- Realization (systems)
- Observability
- Controllability
