= Car analogy =

The car analogy is a common technique, used predominantly in engineering textbooks, to ease the understanding of abstract concepts in which a car, its composite parts, and common circumstances surrounding it are used as analogs for elements of the conceptual systems. The car analogy can be seen elsewhere, in textbooks covering other subjects and at various educational levels, such as explaining regulation of human temperature.

== Uses of car analogies ==
The efficiency of car analogies reside on their capacity to explain difficult concepts (usually due to their high abstraction level) on more mundane terms with which the target audience is comfortable, and with which many also have a special interest. Due to that, car analogies appear more often on works related to applied sciences and technology.

In order to work, car analogies translate agents of action as the car driver, the seller, or police officers; likewise, elements of a system are referred as car pieces, such as wheels, motor, or ignition keys. Resources tend to appear as gas, speed, or as the money that can be spent on better accessories/vehicles.

For example, in the paragraph:

"Zener diodes regulate voltage by acting as complementary loads, drawing more or less current as necessary to ensure a constant voltage drop across the load. This is analogous to regulating the speed of an automobile by braking rather than by varying the throttle position."

Current (resource) is depicted as the car's speed, while the role of the brakes is performed by the Zener diodes (element of the system).

Car analogies are also typically used to explain the quality differences between two similar tools or hardware pieces; in that case, the best one is usually described as a mid-engined Italian supercar or a high-end luxury vehicle.
