= Hautus lemma =

Lemma in control theory

In control theory and in particular when studying the properties of a linear time-invariant system in state space form, the Hautus lemma (after Malo L. J. Hautus), also commonly known as the Popov-Belevitch-Hautus test or PBH test, gives equivalent conditions for certain properties of control systems.

A special case of this result appeared first in 1963 in a paper by Elmer G. Gilbert, and was later expanded to the current PBH test with contributions by Vasile M. Popov in 1966, Vitold Belevitch in 1968, and Malo Hautus in 1969, who emphasized its applicability in proving results for linear time-invariant systems.

== Statement ==
There exist multiple forms of the lemma:

=== Hautus Lemma for controllability ===
The Hautus lemma for controllability says that given a square matrix $\mathbf{A}\in M_n(\Re)$ and a $\mathbf{B}\in M_{n\times m}(\Re)$ the following are equivalent:

1. The pair $(\mathbf{A},\mathbf{B})$ is controllable
2. For all $\lambda\in\mathbb{C}$ it holds that $\operatorname{rank}[\lambda \mathbf{I}-\mathbf{A},\mathbf{B}]=n$
3. For all $\lambda\in\mathbb{C}$ that are eigenvalues of $\mathbf{A}$ it holds that $\operatorname{rank}[\lambda \mathbf{I}-\mathbf{A},\mathbf{B}]=n$

=== Hautus Lemma for stabilizability ===
The Hautus lemma for stabilizability says that given a square matrix $\mathbf{A}\in M_n(\Re)$ and a $\mathbf{B}\in M_{n\times m}(\Re)$ the following are equivalent:

1. The pair $(\mathbf{A},\mathbf{B})$ is stabilizable
2. For all $\lambda\in\mathbb{C}$ that are eigenvalues of $\mathbf{A}$ and for which $\Re(\lambda)\ge 0$ it holds that $\operatorname{rank}[\lambda \mathbf{I}-\mathbf{A},\mathbf{B}]=n$

=== Hautus Lemma for observability ===
The Hautus lemma for observability says that given a square matrix $\mathbf{A}\in M_n(\Re)$ and a $\mathbf{C}\in M_{m\times n}(\Re)$ the following are equivalent:

1. The pair $(\mathbf{A},\mathbf{C})$ is observable.
2. For all $\lambda\in\mathbb{C}$ it holds that $\operatorname{rank}[\lambda \mathbf{I}-\mathbf{A};\mathbf{C}]=n$
3. For all $\lambda\in\mathbb{C}$ that are eigenvalues of $\mathbf{A}$ it holds that $\operatorname{rank}[\lambda \mathbf{I}-\mathbf{A};\mathbf{C}]=n$

=== Hautus Lemma for detectability ===
The Hautus lemma for detectability says that given a square matrix $\mathbf{A}\in M_n(\Re)$ and a $\mathbf{C}\in M_{m\times n}(\Re)$ the following are equivalent:

1. The pair $(\mathbf{A},\mathbf{C})$ is detectable
2. For all $\lambda\in\mathbb{C}$ that are eigenvalues of $\mathbf{A}$ and for which $\Re(\lambda)\ge 0$ it holds that $\operatorname{rank}[\lambda \mathbf{I}-\mathbf{A};\mathbf{C}]=n$
