= Proper transfer function =

In control theory, a proper transfer function is a transfer function in which the degree of the numerator does not exceed the degree of the denominator. A strictly proper transfer function is a transfer function where the degree of the numerator is less than the degree of the denominator.

The difference between the degree of the denominator (number of poles) and degree of the numerator (number of zeros) is the relative degree of the transfer function.

== Example ==
The following transfer function:

$$\textbf{G}(s) = \frac{\textbf{N}(s)}{\textbf{D}(s)} = \frac{s^{4} + n_{1}s^{3} + n_{2}s^{2} + n_{3}s + n_{4}}{s^{4} + d_{1}s^{3} + d_{2}s^{2} + d_{3}s + d_{4}}$$

is proper, because

$$\deg(\textbf{N}(s)) = 4 \leq \deg(\textbf{D}(s)) = 4$$.

is biproper, because

$$\deg(\textbf{N}(s)) = 4 = \deg(\textbf{D}(s)) = 4$$.

but is not strictly proper, because

$$\deg(\textbf{N}(s)) = 4 \nless \deg(\textbf{D}(s)) = 4$$.

The following transfer function is not proper (or strictly proper)

$$\textbf{G}(s) = \frac{\textbf{N}(s)}{\textbf{D}(s)} = \frac{s^{4} + n_{1}s^{3} + n_{2}s^{2} + n_{3}s + n_{4}}{d_{1}s^{3} + d_{2}s^{2} + d_{3}s + d_{4}}$$

because

$$\deg(\textbf{N}(s)) = 4 \nleq \deg(\textbf{D}(s)) = 3$$.

A not proper transfer function can be made proper, even strictly proper, by using the method of long division.

The following transfer function is strictly proper

$$\textbf{G}(s) = \frac{\textbf{N}(s)}{\textbf{D}(s)} = \frac{n_{1}s^{3} + n_{2}s^{2} + n_{3}s + n_{4}}{s^{4} + d_{1}s^{3} + d_{2}s^{2} + d_{3}s + d_{4}}$$

because

$$\deg(\textbf{N}(s)) = 3 < \deg(\textbf{D}(s)) = 4$$.

== Implications ==
A proper transfer function will never grow unbounded as the frequency approaches infinity:

$$|\textbf{G}(\pm j\infty)| < \infty$$

A strictly proper transfer function will approach zero as the frequency approaches infinity (which is true for all physical processes):

$$\textbf{G}(\pm j\infty) = 0$$

Also, the integral of the real part of a strictly proper transfer function is zero.
