= Single-input single-output system =

In control engineering, a single-input and single-output (SISO) system is a simple single-variable control system with one input and one output. In radio, it is the use of only one antenna both in the transmitter and receiver.

== Details ==
SISO systems are typically less complex than multiple-input multiple-output (MIMO) systems. Usually, it is also easier to make an order of magnitude or trending predictions "on the fly" or "back of the envelope". MIMO systems have too many interactions for most of us to trace through them quickly, thoroughly, and effectively in our heads.

Frequency domain techniques for analysis and controller design dominate SISO control system theory. Bode plot, Nyquist stability criterion, Nichols plot, and root locus are the usual tools for SISO system analysis. Controllers can be designed through the polynomial design, root locus design methods to name just two of the more popular. Often SISO controllers will be PI, PID, or lead-lag.

== See also ==
- Control theory
