= Petar V. Kokotovic =

Serbian control theorist (born 1934)

Petar V. Kokotović
- Born: 1934 (age 91–92); Belgrade, Kingdom of Yugoslavia
- Citizenship: United States
- Known for: Development and applications of large-scale systems analysis and adaptive control theory.
- Awards: Richard E. Bellman Control Heritage Award (2002); IEEE Control Systems Award (1995); IFAC Quazza Medal (1990)
- Scientific career
- Fields: Control theory, Adaptive control, Nonlinear control, Optimal control, Robust control
- Doctoral students: Joe Chow; Charles Robert Hadlock; Petros A. Ioannou; Hassan K. Khalil; Miroslav Krstić

Petar V. Kokotovic (Serbian: Петар В. Кокотовић / Petar V. Kokotović; born 1934) is professor emeritus in the College of Engineering at the University of California, Santa Barbara, USA. He has made contributions in the areas of adaptive control, singular perturbation techniques, and nonlinear control especially the backstepping stabilization method.

== Biography ==
Kokotovic was born in Belgrade in 1934. He received his B.S. (1958) and M.S. (1963) degrees from the University of Belgrade Faculty of Electrical Engineering, and his Ph.D. (1965) from the USSR Academy of Sciences (Institute of Automation and Remote Control), Moscow.

He came to the United States in 1965 and was professor at the University of Illinois for 25 years. He joined the University of California, Santa Barbara, in 1991, where he was the founding and long-serving director of the Center for Control, Dynamical Systems and Computation. This center has become a role model of cross-disciplinary research and education. One of the center's achievements is a fully integrated cross-disciplinary graduate program for electrical and computer, mechanical and environmental, and chemical engineering fields.

At UC Santa Barbara his group developed constructive nonlinear control methods and applied them, with colleagues from MIT, Caltech and United Technologies Research Center, to new jet engine designs. As a long-term industrial consultant, he has contributed to computer controls at Ford and to power system stability at General Electric.

For his control systems contributions, Professor Kokotovic has been recognized with the triennial Quazza Medal from the International Federation of Automatic Control (IFAC), the Control Systems Field Award from the Institute of Electrical and Electronics Engineers (IEEE), and the 2002 Richard E. Bellman Control Heritage Award from the American Automatic Control Council, with the citation "for pioneering contributions to control theory and engineering, and for inspirational leadership as mentor, advisor, and lecturer over a period spanning four decades."

Kokotovic was elected a member of the National Academy of Engineering in 1996 for the development and applications of large-scale systems analysis and adaptive control theory. He is a foreign member of the Russian Academy of Sciences, and Fellow of IEEE. His honors also include the D.C. Drucker Eminent Faculty Award and two IEEE Transactions on Automatic Control outstanding paper awards.

Dr. Kokotovic has co-authored numerous papers and ten books.

His former students include Joe Chow, Charles Robert Hadlock, Petros A. Ioannou, Hassan Khalil, and Miroslav Krstić.

== Recognitions ==
- Fellow of the IEEE, 1980
- Lecturer at the French National Seminar (CNRS) on "New Tools for Control," Paris, 1982
- Outstanding Paper Award, IEEE Transactions on Automatic Control, 1984
- D.C. Drucker Eminent Faculty Award, University of Illinois, Urbana, 1987
- Grainger Endowed Chair, University of Illinois, Urbana, 1990
- Quazza Medal, Highest Triennial Award, International Federation of Automatic Control, 1990
- IEEE Bode Prize Lecture, 1991
- Foreign Expert to Evaluate French National Institute (INRIA), 1992
- The 1993 IEEE Outstanding Transactions Paper Award
- The 1995 IEEE Control Systems Award
- Member, National Academy of Engineering, 1996
- IEEE James H. Mulligan, Jr. Education Medal, IEEE, 2001
- Richard E. Bellman Control Heritage Award, American Automatic Control Council, 2002.
- Foreign member of the Russian Academy of Sciences, 2011

== See also ==
- Backstepping
