= Comparison function =

In applied mathematics, comparison functions are several classes of continuous functions, which are used in stability theory to characterize the stability properties of control systems as Lyapunov stability, uniform asymptotic stability etc.

Let $C(X,Y)$ be a space of continuous functions acting from $X$ to $Y$. The most important classes of comparison functions are:

$$\begin{align}
\mathcal{P} &:= \left\{\gamma \in C({\mathbb{R}}_+,{\mathbb{R}}_+): \gamma(0)=0 \text{ and } \gamma(r)>0 \text{ for } r>0  \right\} \\[4pt]
\mathcal{K} &:= \left\{\gamma \in {\mathcal{P}}: \gamma \text{ is strictly increasing}   \right\}\\[4pt]
\mathcal{K}_\infty &:=\left\{\gamma\in{\mathcal{K}}: \gamma\text{ is unbounded}\right\}\\[4pt]
\mathcal{L} &:=\{\gamma\in C({\mathbb{R}}_+,{\mathbb{R}}_+): \gamma\text{ is strictly decreasing with } \lim_{t\rightarrow\infty}\gamma(t)=0 \}\\[4pt]
\mathcal{KL} &:= \left\{\beta \in C({\mathbb{R}}_+\times{\mathbb{R}}_+,{\mathbb{R}}_+): \beta \text{ is continuous, } \beta(\cdot,t)\in{{\mathcal{K}}},\ \forall t \geq 0, \  \beta(r,\cdot)\in {{\mathcal{L}}},\ \forall r > 0\right\}
\end{align}$$

Functions of class ${\mathcal{P}}$ are also called positive-definite functions.

One of the most important properties of comparison functions is given by Sontag’s ${\mathcal{KL}}$-Lemma, named after Eduardo Sontag. It says that for each $\beta \in {\mathcal{KL}}$ and any $\lambda>0$ there exist $\alpha_1,\alpha_2 \in {\mathcal{K_\infty}}$:

$\alpha_1(\beta(s,t)) \leq \alpha_2(s) e^{-\lambda t}, \quad t,s \in \R_+.$

1

Many further useful properties of comparison functions can be found in.

Comparison functions are primarily used to obtain quantitative restatements of stability properties as Lyapunov stability, uniform asymptotic stability, etc. These restatements are often more useful than the qualitative definitions of stability properties given in $\varepsilon\text{-}\delta$ language.

As an example, consider an ordinary differential equation

$\dot{x} = f(x),$

2

where $f:{\mathbb{R}}^n\to{\mathbb{R}}^n$ is locally Lipschitz. Then:

- (2) is globally stable if and only if there is a $\sigma\in{\mathcal{K_\infty}}$ so that for any initial condition $x_0 \in{\mathbb{R}}^n$ and for any $t\geq 0$ it holds that

$$|x(t)| \leq \sigma(|x_0|).$$	3

- (2) is globally asymptotically stable if and only if there is a $\beta\in{\mathcal{KL}}$ so that for any initial condition $x_0 \in{\mathbb{R}}^n$ and for any $t\geq 0$ it holds that

$$|x(t)| \leq \beta(|x_0|,t).$$	4

The comparison-functions formalism is widely used in input-to-state stability theory.
