= Chetaev instability theorem =

The Chetaev instability theorem for dynamical systems states that if there exists, for the system $\dot{\textbf{x}} = X(\textbf{x})$ with an equilibrium point at the origin, a continuously differentiable function V(x) such that

1. the origin is a boundary point of the set $G = \{\mathbf{x} \mid V(\mathbf{x})>0\}$;
2. there exists a neighborhood $U$ of the origin such that $\dot{V}(\textbf{x})>0$ for all $\mathbf{x} \in G \cap U$

then the origin is an unstable equilibrium point of the system.

This theorem is somewhat less restrictive than the Lyapunov instability theorems, since a complete sphere (circle) around the origin for which $V$ and $\dot{V}$ both are of the same sign does not have to be produced.

It is named after Nicolai Gurevich Chetaev.

== Applications ==
Chetaev instability theorem has been used to analyze the unfolding dynamics of proteins under the effect of optical tweezers.

== See also ==
- Lyapunov function — a function whose existence guarantees stability
