= Yuan Wang (control theorist) =

Chinese-American control theorist

Yuan Wang (Chinese: 王沅) is a Chinese-American mathematician specializing in control theory and known for her research on input-to-state stability. She is a professor of mathematics at Florida Atlantic University, chair of the university's Department of Mathematical Sciences, and a moderator for the arXiv mathematical preprint repository in the areas of optimization and control (math.OC) and systems and control (cs.SY).

== Education and career ==
Wang studied mathematics at Shandong University in China, graduating with a bachelor's degree in 1982. She completed a Ph.D. in 1990 at Rutgers University, with the dissertation Algebraic Differential Equations and Nonlinear Control Systems supervised by Eduardo D. Sontag.

She joined Florida Atlantic University as an assistant professor of mathematics in 1990. She was promoted to associate professor in 1995 and full professor in 2000.

== Recognition ==
Wang was named as an IEEE Fellow in 2013, "for contributions to stability and control of nonlinear systems".
