= Massera's lemma =

In stability theory and nonlinear control, Massera's lemma, named after José Luis Massera, deals with the construction of the Lyapunov function to prove the stability of a dynamical system. The lemma appears in (Massera 1949, p. 716) as the first lemma in section 12, and in more general form in (Massera 1956, p. 195) as lemma 2. In 2004, Massera's original lemma for single variable functions was extended to the multivariable case, and the resulting lemma was used to prove the stability of switched dynamical systems, where a common Lyapunov function describes the stability of multiple modes and switching signals.

== Massera's original lemma ==
Massera's lemma is used in the construction of a converse Lyapunov function of the following form (also known as the integral construction)

$$V(\zeta)=\int_0^\infty G(|\varphi(t,\zeta)|) \, dt$$

for an asymptotically stable dynamical system whose stable trajectory starting from $\zeta \text{ is } \varphi(t,\zeta).$

The lemma states:

Let $g: [0, \infty)\rightarrow R$ be a positive, continuous, strictly decreasing function with $g(t)\rightarrow 0$ as $t\rightarrow\infty$. Let $h: [0, \infty)\rightarrow R$ be a positive, continuous, nondecreasing function. Then there exists a function $G:[0,\infty) \rightarrow [0,\infty)$ such that

- $G$ and its derivative $G'$ are class-K functions defined for all t ≥ 0
- There exist positive constants k_{1}, k_{2}, such that for any continuous function u satisfying 0 ≤ u(t) ≤ g(t) for all t ≥ 0,

$$\int_0^\infty G(u(t)) \, dt \leq k_1; \quad \int_0^\infty G'(u(t))h(t) \, dt \leq k_2.$$

== Extension to multivariable functions ==
Massera's lemma for single variable functions was extended to the multivariable case by Vu and Liberzon.

Let $g: [0, \infty)\rightarrow R$ be a positive, continuous, strictly decreasing function with $g(t)\rightarrow 0$ as $t\rightarrow\infty$. Let $h: [0, \infty)\rightarrow R$ be a positive, continuous, nondecreasing function. Then there exists a differentiable function $G:[0,\infty) \rightarrow [0,\infty)$ such that

- $G$ and its derivative $G'$ are class-K functions on $[0, \infty)$.
- For every positive integer $\ell$, there exist positive constants k_{1}, k_{2}, such that for any continuous function $u: \mathbb{R}^\ell \rightarrow[0, \infty)$ satisfying

$0\leq u(t_1, \ldots, t_\ell) \leq g(t_1 + \cdots + t_\ell)$ for all $t_i \ge 0$, $i=1,\ldots,\ell$
we have

$$\int_0^\infty \cdots \int_0^\infty G(u(s_1, \ldots, s_\ell)) \, ds_1 \ldots ds_\ell < k_1$$
$$\int_0^\infty \cdots \int_0^\infty G'(u(s_1, \ldots, s_\ell)) \times h(s_1 + \cdots + s_\ell) \, ds_1 \ldots ds_\ell < k_2$$
