= Charles Robert Hadlock =

American mathematician (born 1947)

Charles Robert Hadlock (born April 19, 1947, in Brooklyn, New York City) is an American applied mathematician, professor emeritus of mathematical sciences, and consultant in risk analysis. In 1985 he was awarded the inaugural Beckenbach Book Prize for his 1975 book Field theory and its classical problems. In July 2019 he was a George Póya Lecturer.

== Education and career ==
In June 1964 Charles R. Hadlock graduated from Brooklyn's Xaverian High School. In 1967 he received from Providence College a bachelor's degree in mathematics. In 1970 he graduated from the University of Illinois Urbana-Champaign with a Ph.D. in mathematics. His Ph.D. thesis Singular Perturbations of a Class of Two Point Boundary Value Problems Arising in Optimal Control was supervised by Petar V. Kokotovic. Hadlock was from 1970 to 1975 an assistant professor of mathematics at Amherst College and from 1976 to 1977 an assistant professor of mathematics at Bowdoin College. At the management consulting company Arthur D. Little, he was from 1977 to 1979 a senior consultant and from 1979 to 1990 a manager in safety and environmental risk. After 13 years in corporate consulting, he became in 1990 a professor in mathematical sciences at Bentley College (renamed in 2008 Bentley University). There he served as department chair and dean of the undergraduate college. He retired as professor emeritus in 2019. For the academic year 1996–1997 he was on leave of absence as a visiting professor of earth, atmospheric, and planetary sciences at Massachusetts Institute of Technology.

Hadlock's research in applied mathematician involves risk analysis, agent-based simulations, environmental management, service-learning, and various forms of mathematical modeling. During his years with Arthur D. Little, Inc., he worked on environmental cases such as the Love Canal toxic chemical pollution, the Bhopal disaster, and the Three Mile Island accident. His research and teaching dealt with mathematical models of stability of societal structures, economic and environmental changes, new forms of conflict, and bad leadership in the corporate and public sectors.

== Personal life ==
In 1967, Hadlock married Joanne Theresa Miscione. They have a son and a daughter. For many years, during every summer there were family gatherings near a lake in Michigan. After raising their two children, Joanne earned a Ph.D. and became a licensed psychologist. She also wrote a book Yard Sale Savvy: The Ultimate Guide to Bargains, Treasures, and Fun, published in 2011. In 2021, Charles and Joanne Hadlock retired to an oceanside community in Scarborough, Maine.

== Selected publications ==
=== Articles ===
- Towne, Dudley H.; Hadlock, Charles R. (1977). "One-dimensional collisions and Chebyshev polynomials". American Journal of Physics. 45 (3): 255–259. Bibcode:1977AmJPh..45..255T. doi:10.1119/1.11003.
- Nuclear Energy Agency conference committee, ed. (1989). "USEPA consideration of human intrusion in setting radioactive waste disposal standards by D. J. Egan and C. R. Hadlock". in: Risks associated with human intrusion at radioactive waste disposal sites : proceedings of an NEA Workshop, Paris, 5-7 June 1989 = Risques liés a l'intrusion humaine sur les sites d'évacuation de déchets radioactifs : compte rendu d'une réunion de travail de l'AEN, Paris, 5-7 juin 1989. Paris: Nuclear Energy Agency, Organisation for Economic Co-operation and Development (OECD). pp. 49–51. ISBN 9264032924. LCCN 90180734. abstract for conference paper by Egan & Hadlock; abstract for book
- Hadlock, Charles R. (2003). "Using Math in Environmental Detective Work". Environmental Mathematics in the Classroom. pp. 39–54. doi:10.1090/clrm/022/04. ISBN 978-1-4704-5710-5.
- Hadock, C. R., ed. (2005). "Chapter 5. Untapped possibilities? by C. R. Hadlock" (PDF). Mathematics in service to the community: concepts and models for service-learning in the mathematical sciences. MAA Notes, no. 66. Washington, D.C.: Mathematical Association of America. pp. 237–247.
- Hadlock, Charles R. (2007). "Practicing Mathematics in the Public Arena: Challenges and Outcomes in Some Prominent Case Studies". The American Mathematical Monthly. 114 (10): 849–870. doi:10.1080/00029890.2007.11920479. S2CID 8266097.
- Adams, Susan M.; Carter, Nathan C.; Hadlock, Charles R.; Haughton, Dominique M.; Sirbu, George (2008). "Proactive encouragement of interdisciplinary research teams in a business school environment: Strategy and results". Journal of Higher Education Policy and Management. 30 (2): 153–164. doi:10.1080/13600800801938754. S2CID 154756462.
- Gulati, Girish J.; Hadlock, Charles R.; Gainsborough, Juliet F. (2011). "VODYS: An Agent-Based Model for Exploring Campaign Dynamics". Social Science Computer Review. 29 (2): 250–272. doi:10.1177/0894439310372790. S2CID 62136167.
- Hadlock, Charles R. (2013). "Service-Learning in the Mathematical Sciences". PRIMUS. 23 (6): 500–506. doi:10.1080/10511970.2012.736453. S2CID 119595996.
- Hadlock, Charles R. (2013). "Underground Mathematics". The College Mathematics Journal. 44 (5): 364–375. doi:10.4169/college.math.j.44.5.364. S2CID 218542862.
- Hadlock, Charles R.; Woolford, Samuel W. (2019). "Optimizing management of emergency gas leaks: A case study in business analytics". Journal of Business Analytics. 2: 88–99. doi:10.1080/2573234X.2019.1638735. S2CID 199016479.

=== Books ===
- Hadlock, Charles Robert (5 December 2018). Field Theory and Its Classical Problems. Carus Mathematical Monographs, vol. 35. American Mathematical Soc. ISBN 978-1-4704-4960-5; 1st edition, 1975; 2nd edition. 1978. LCCN 78071937. 2000 edition. ISBN 978-0-88385-032-9. description at Cambridge University Press
- Hadlock, Charles R. (1998). Mathematical Modeling in the Environment. Cambridge University Press. ISBN 978-0-88385-709-0. LCCN 98085695.
  - Hadlock, Charles R. (5 May 2020). Supplementary Material and Solutions Manual for Mathematical Modeling in the Environment. American Mathematical Society / Mathematical Association of America. ISBN 978-0-88385-713-7; 1st edition, 1998
- Hadlock, Charles R., ed. (2005). Mathematics in service to the community: concepts and models for service-learning in the mathematical sciences (PDF). MAA Notes, no. 66. Washington, D.C.: Mathematical Association of America. ISBN 0883851768. LCCN 2005927468; xiv+264 pages
- Hadlock, Charles R. (2012). Six sources of collapse: a mathematician's perspective on how things can fall apart in the blink of an eye. Washington, D.C.: Mathematical Association of America. ISBN 978-0-88385-579-9. LCCN 2012950085.
