= Hassan K. Khalil =

Egyptian-born American electrical engineer

- Born: February 20, 1950 (age 76); Cairo, Egypt
- Education: Cairo University (B.S., M.S.); University of Illinois Urbana-Champaign (Ph.D.)
- Known for: Nonlinear control Singular perturbation theory High-gain observers Nonlinear Systems (textbook)
- Awards: IEEE Fellow (1989); IFAC Fellow (2007); John R. Ragazzini Award (2000); IFAC Textbook Prize (2002)
- Scientific career
- Fields: Electrical engineering Control theory
- Workplaces: Michigan State University (University Distinguished Professor Emeritus)
- Doctoral advisor: Petar V. Kokotovic

Hassan K. Khalil (born February 20, 1950, in Cairo) is an Egyptian-American electrical engineer and University Distinguished Professor Emeritus at Michigan State University. He specializes in nonlinear control and singular perturbation theory, and is widely known for his textbook Nonlinear Systems, which received the 2002 IFAC Control Engineering Textbook Prize. He was named a Fellow of the Institute of Electrical and Electronics Engineers (IEEE) in 1989 for contributions to singular perturbation theory and its application to control.

== Education ==
Khalil received his B.S. (1973) and M.S. (1975) degrees in electrical engineering from Cairo University. Moving to the United States for doctoral studies, he earned his Ph.D. (1978) from the University of Illinois at Urbana-Champaign under the supervision of Petar V. Kokotovic.

== Academic career ==
Khalil joined Michigan State University as an assistant professor in 1978, the same year he completed his doctorate. Over his career at MSU, he advanced to become University Distinguished Professor in 2003, receiving multiple teaching honors along the way, including the Teacher Scholar Award (1983), the Withrow Distinguished Scholar Award (1994), the Distinguished Faculty Award (1995), and the Withrow Teaching Excellence Award (2020). Throughout his tenure, Khalil also consulted for General Motors and Delco Electronics.

A major focus of Khalil's research program at MSU has been the development of high-gain observers for nonlinear feedback control, a tool that originated at the university and has been advanced through the work of his 16 doctoral students and numerous postdoctoral researchers. Khalil has published over 120 journal papers on singular perturbation methods and nonlinear control.

In professional service, Khalil served as associate editor for the IEEE Transactions on Automatic Control (1984–1985), Automatica (1992–1999), and Neural Networks (1997–1998), and later as editor of Automatica for nonlinear systems and control (1999–2008). He was Program Chair of the 1988 American Control Conference and General Chair of the 1994 conference.

Khalil retired on May 15, 2020, and was granted emeritus status.

== Books ==
- Singular Perturbation Methods in Control: Analysis and Design (with Petar V. Kokotovic and John O'Reilly), Academic Press, 1986; reprinted by SIAM, 1999.
- Nonlinear Systems, Macmillan, 1992; 2nd edition, Prentice Hall, 1996; 3rd edition, Prentice Hall, 2002, ISBN 0-13-067389-7.
- Nonlinear Control, Pearson, 2015, ISBN 0-13-349926-X.
- High-Gain Observers in Nonlinear Feedback Control, SIAM, 2017, ISBN 978-1-61197-485-0.
- Control Systems: An Introduction, Michigan Publishing Services, 2024.

== Selected papers ==
- Esfandiari, Farzad; Khalil, Hassan K. (1 November 1992). "Output feedback stabilization of fully linearizable systems". International Journal of Control. 56 (5): 1007–1037. doi:10.1080/00207179208934355.
- Atassi, A.N.; Khalil, H.K. (Sep 1999). "A separation principle for the stabilization of a class of nonlinear systems". IEEE Transactions on Automatic Control. 44 (9): 1672–1687. doi:10.1109/9.788534. S2CID 11458113.
- Khalil, H.K. (Feb 1996). "Adaptive output feedback control of nonlinear systems represented by input-output models". IEEE Transactions on Automatic Control. 41 (2): 177–188. doi:10.1109/9.481517.
- Seshagiri, S.; Khalil, H.K. (Jan 2000). "Output feedback control of nonlinear systems using RBF neural networks". IEEE Transactions on Neural Networks. 11 (1): 69–79. doi:10.1109/72.822511. PMID 18249740.

== Awards and honors ==
- IEEE Fellow (1989), for contributions to singular perturbation theory and its application to control
- George S. Axelby Outstanding Paper Award, IEEE Control Systems Society (1989)
- John R. Ragazzini Education Award, American Automatic Control Council (2000)
- IFAC Control Engineering Textbook Prize (2002)
- O. Hugo Schuck Best Paper Award, American Automatic Control Council (2004)
- IFAC Fellow (2007), for contributions to singular perturbation theory, nonlinear feedback control, and control education
- Bode Lecture Prize, IEEE Control Systems Society (2015)
- Rufus Oldenburger Medal, ASME (2025)
