= Eduardo D. Sontag =

Argentine American mathematician

Eduardo Daniel Sontag
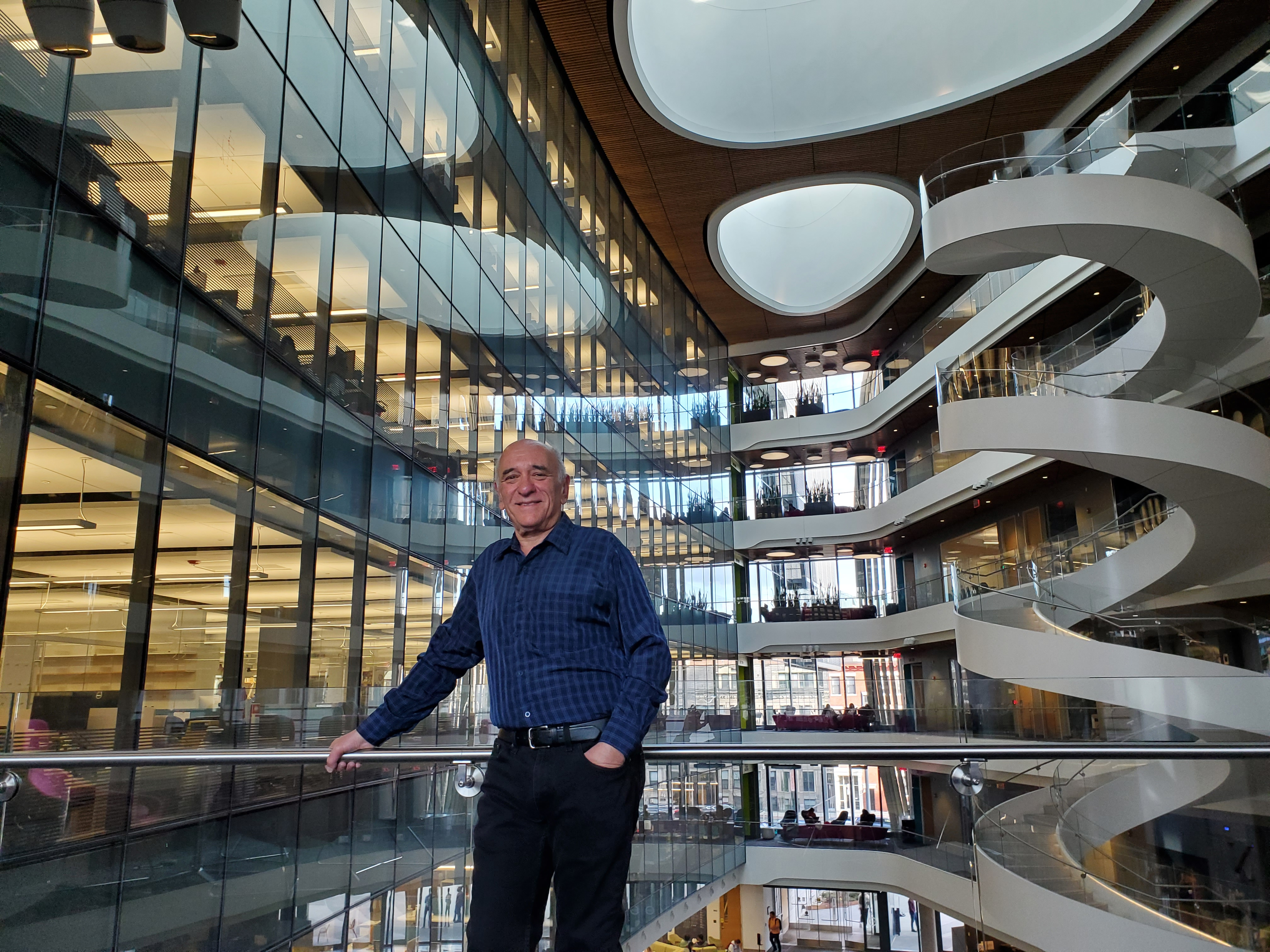
- Sontag at Northeastern University, April 2022
- Born: April 16, 1951; Buenos Aires, Argentina
- Education: University of Florida; University of Buenos Aires
- Scientific career
- Fields: Control theory Systems biology Mathematical modeling of cancer
- Workplaces: Northeastern University
- Thesis: On the Internal Realization of Polynomial Response Maps (1976)
- Doctoral advisor: Rudolf Kalman
- Doctoral students: Hava Siegelmann; Yuan Wang

Eduardo Daniel Sontag (born April 16, 1951, in Buenos Aires, Argentina) is an Argentine-American mathematician, and distinguished university professor at Northeastern University, who works in the fields control theory, dynamical systems, systems molecular biology, cancer and immunology, theoretical computer science, neural networks, and computational biology.

== Biography ==
Sontag received his Licenciado degree from the mathematics department at the University of Buenos Aires in 1972, and his Ph.D. in Mathematics under Rudolf Kálmán at the Center for Mathematical Systems Theory at the University of Florida in 1976.

From 1977 to 2017, he was with the department of mathematics at Rutgers, The State University of New Jersey, where he was a Distinguished Professor of Mathematics as well as a member of the graduate faculty of the Department of Computer Science and the graduate faculty of the Department of Electrical and Computer Engineering, and a member of the Rutgers Cancer Institute of NJ. In addition, Dr. Sontag served as the head of the undergraduate biomathematics interdisciplinary major, director of the Center for Quantitative Biology, and director of graduate studies of the Institute for Quantitative Biomedicine. In January 2018, Dr. Sontag was appointed as a University Distinguished Professor in the Department of Electrical and Computer Engineering and the Department of BioEngineering at Northeastern University, where he is also an affiliate member of the Department of Mathematics and the Department of Chemical Engineering. Since 2006, he has been a research affiliate at the Laboratory for Information and Decision Systems at MIT, and since 2018 he has been a member of the faculty in the Program in Therapeutic Science, Laboratory for Systems Pharmacology at Harvard Medical School.

Eduardo Sontag has authored several hundred research papers and monographs and book chapters in the above areas with about 67,000 citations and an h-index of 111. He is in the editorial board of several journals, including: IET Proceedings Systems Biology, Synthetic and Systems Biology International Journal of Biological Sciences, and Journal of Computer and Systems Sciences, and is a former board member of SIAM Review, IEEE Transactions on Automatic Control, Systems and Control Letters, Dynamics and Control, Neurocomputing, Neural Networks, Neural Computing Surveys, Control-Theory and Advanced Technology, Nonlinear Analysis: Hybrid Systems, and Control, Optimization and the Calculus of Variations. In addition, he is a co-founder and co-Managing Editor of Mathematics of Control, Signals, and Systems.

Sontag was married to Frances David-Sontag, who died in 2017. His daughter Laura Kleiman is founder and CEO at Reboot Rx, and his son David Sontag leads the MIT Clinical Machine Learning Group.

== Work ==
His work in control theory led to the introduction of the concept of input-to-state stability (ISS), a stability theory notion for nonlinear systems, and control-Lyapunov functions. Many of the subsequent results were proved in collaboration with his student Yuan Wang and with David Angeli. In systems biology, Sontag introduced together with David Angeli the concept of input/output monotone system. In theory of computation, he proved the first results on computational complexity in nonlinear controllability, and introduced together with his student Hava Siegelmann a new approach to analog computation and super-Turing computing.

== Awards and honors ==
Sontag became an Institute of Electrical and Electronics Engineers (IEEE) Fellow in 1993. He was awarded the Reid Prize in Mathematics in 2001, the 2002 Hendrik W. Bode Lecture Prize from the IEEE, the 2002 Board of Trustees Award for Excellence in Research from Rutgers University, the 2005 Teacher/Scholar Award from Rutgers University, and the 2011 IEEE Control Systems Award. In 2022, he was awarded the Richard E. Bellman Control Heritage Award, which is the highest recognition in control theory and engineering in the United States. He was honored “for pioneering contributions to stability analysis and nonlinear control, and for advancing the control theoretic foundations of systems biology.” In 2011 he became a fellow of the Society for Industrial and Applied Mathematics, in 2012 a fellow of the American Mathematical Society, and in 2014 a fellow of the International Federation of Automatic Control. Sontag was elected a Member of the American Academy of Arts and Sciences in April 2024. Sontag was elected into the US National Academy of Sciences in April 2025.

== Publications ==
Sontag is co-author of several hundred research papers, as well as three books:

- 1972, Topics in Artificial Intelligence (in Spanish, Buenos Aires: Prolam, 1972)
- 1979, Polynomial Response Maps (Berlin: Springer, 1979).
- 1998, Mathematical Control Theory: Deterministic Finite Dimensional Systems, 2nd Edition (Texts in Applied Mathematics, Volume 6, Second Edition, New York: Springer, 1998)
