= José Luis Massera =

Uruguayan mathematician (1915–2002)

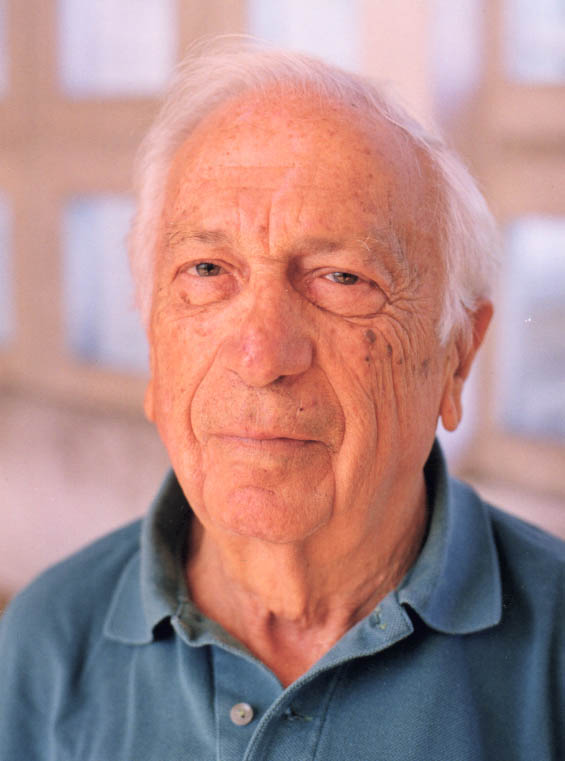
- José Luis Massera
- Born: José Luis Massera; June 8, 1915; Italy
- Died: September 9, 2002 (aged 87); Uruguay
- Occupations: Mathematician, engineer, writer, politician
- Political party: Communist Party of Uruguay
- Spouse(s): Carmen Garayalde, Marta Valentini
- Children: Ema, José Pedro
- Awards: Premio México de Ciencia y Tecnología (1997)

José Luis Massera (Genoa, Italy, June 8, 1915 – Montevideo, September 9, 2002) was a Uruguayan dissident and mathematician who researched the stability of differential equations.

Massera's lemma is named after him. He published over 40 papers during 1940–1970. A militant Communist, he was a political prisoner during 1975–1984. In the 1930s, Julio Rey Pastor gave regular weekend lectures on topology in Montevideo to a group that included Massera. Stimulated by contact with Argentine mathematics, the 1950s saw Uruguay develop a fine school in mathematics, of which Massera was very much a part.

Massera developed new notions of stability, and published several foundational papers and an influential textbook. His results in (Massera 1950) on periodic differential equations have been heavily cited and are referred to as Massera's theorem. His work in (Massera 1949) and (Massera 1956) on the converse to Lyapunov's criterion is also influential, and contain the well known Massera's lemma. His textbook (Massera & Schäffer 1966) is also heavily cited.

After military intervention in Uruguay in 1973, Massera was arrested on October 22, 1975 in Montevideo and was held in solitary confinement for nearly a year. During this time he was subjected to repeated torture resulting in injuries including a fractured pelvis. In October 1976 he was taken from solitary confinement, tried and convicted for "subversive association", and given a 24-year prison sentence. On June 22, 1979, as a consequence of a proposal put forward by Gaetano Fichera and unanimously approved by the whole Mathematics Faculty Council of the Sapienza University of Rome, he was awarded the laurea honoris causa while still being under conviction. He was released in 1984.

== Honors ==
- The outer main-belt asteroid 10690 Massera, discovered by American astronomer Schelte Bus at the Australian Siding Spring Observatory in 1981, was named in his memory on 13 April 2017 (M.P.C. 103976).

== Selected works ==
- Massera, José Luis (1949), "On Liapounoff's conditions of stability", Annals of Mathematics, Second Series, 50 (3), The Annals of Mathematics, Vol. 50, No. 3: 705–721, doi:10.2307/1969558, JSTOR 1969558, MR 0035354, Zbl 0038.25003.
- Massera, José Luis (1950), "The existence of periodic solutions of systems of differential equations", Duke Mathematical Journal, 17 (4): 457–475, doi:10.1215/S0012-7094-50-01741-8, MR 0040512, Zbl 0038.25002.
- Massera, José Luis (1956), "Contributions to stability theory", Annals of Mathematics, Second Series, 64 (1), The Annals of Mathematics, Vol. 64, No. 1: 182–206, doi:10.2307/1969955, JSTOR 1969955, MR 0079179, Zbl 0070.31003.
- Massera, José Luis; Schäffer, Juan Jorge (1966), Linear differential equations and function spaces, Pure and Applied Mathematics, Vol. 21, Boston, MA: Academic Press, MR 0212324, Zbl 0243.34107

== Biographical references ==
- Vernacchia-Galli, Jole (1986), "José Luis Massera", Regesto delle lauree honoris causa dal 1944 al 1985, Studi e Fonti per la storia dell'Università di Roma (in Italian and Spanish), vol. 10, Roma: Edizioni Dell'Ateneo, pp. 559–605. The "regest of honoris causa degrees from 1944 to 1985" (English translation of the title) is a detailed and carefully commented regest of all the documents of the official archive of the Sapienza University of Rome pertaining to the honoris causa degrees, awarded or not. It includes all the awarding proposals submitted during the considered period, detailed presentations of the work of the candidate, if available, and precise references to related articles published on Italian newspapers and magazines, if the laurea was awarded.
