= Multiple models =

Adaptive Control with Multiple Models

Multi Observer Schema

In control theory, multiple model control is an approach to ensure stability in cases of large model uncertainty or changing plant dynamics. It uses a number of models, which are distributed to give a suitable cover of the region of uncertainty, and adapts control based on the responses of the plant and the models. A model is chosen at every instant, depending on which is closest to the plant according to some metric, and this is used to determine the appropriate control input. The method offers satisfactory performance when no restrictions are put on the number of available models.

== Approaches ==
There are a number of multiple model methods, including:

- “Switching”, the control input to the plant is based on the fixed model chosen at that instant. It is discontinuous, fast, but coarse. However it does have the advantage of verifiable stability bounds.
- “Switching and tuning”, an adaptive model is initialized from the location of the fixed model chosen, and the parameters of the best model determine the control to be used. It is continuous, slow, but accurate.
- "Blending", the control input is chosen based on a weighted combination of a number of suitable models.

== Applications ==
Multiple model method can be used for:

- controlling an unknown plant - parameter estimate and the identification errors can be used collectively to determine the control input to the overall system,
- applying multi observer - significantly improving transients and reducing observer overshoot.

== See also ==
- State observer
- Adaptive control
