= Hava Siegelmann =

Computer scientist

- Born: August 23, 1964 (age 62); Haifa
- Education: Rutgers University
- Known for: Hypercomputation
- Awards: Meritorious Public Service Medal
- Scientific career
- Fields: computer science, neuroscience, system biology, biomedical engineering
- Workplaces: University of Massachusetts Amherst
- Thesis: Foundations of Recurrent Neural Networks (1993)
- Doctoral advisor: Eduardo Daniel Sontag

Hava Siegelmann is an American computer scientist and Provost Professor at the University of Massachusetts Amherst.

== Biography ==
Siegelmann earned her Ph.D. in Computer Science at Rutgers University in 1993 under Eduardo Sontag. Her dissertation was on the hypercomputation. She earned an M.Sc. in Computer Science at Hebrew University in 1992 and a B.A. in Computer Science at the Technion in 1988. She also shortly worked at MIT.

Siegelmann was a program manager of several DARPA AI programs including Lifelong Learning Machines, Guaranteeing AI Robustness Against Deception, and Cooperative Secure Learning. DARPA/DoD awarded her with the Meritorious Public Service Medal for her research and leadership.

== Selected publications ==
- Ben-Hur, A.; Horn, D.; Siegelmann, H.T.; Vapnik, V. (2001). "Support vector clustering". Journal of Machine Learning Research. 2: 125–137.
- Siegelmann, H.T. (1995). "Computation Beyond the Turing Limit". Science. 238 (28): 632–637. Bibcode:1995Sci...268..545S. doi:10.1126/science.268.5210.545. PMID 17756722. S2CID 17495161.
- Siegelmann, Hava T. (1999). Neural networks and analog computation: beyond the Turing limit. Boston, Mass.: Birkhäuser. ISBN 0-8176-3949-7. OCLC 39485184.
- Siegelmann, H.T.; Ben-Hur, A.; Fishman, S. (1999). "Computational Complexity for Continuous Time Dynamics". Physical Review Letters. 83 (7): 1463–1466. Bibcode:1999PhRvL..83.1463S. doi:10.1103/physrevlett.83.1463.
