= Loop performance =

Loop performance in control engineering indicates the performance of control loops, such as a regulatory PID loop. Performance refers to the accuracy of a control system's ability to track (output) the desired signals to regulate the plant process variables in the most beneficial and optimised way, without delay or overshoot.

== Importance ==
Regulatory control loops are critical in automated manufacturing and utility industries like refining, paper and chemicals manufacturing, power generation, among others. They are used to control a particular parameter within a process. The parameter that is being controlled could be temperature, pressure, flow or level of some process. For example, temperature controllers are used in boilers which are used in production of gasoline.

== Software ==
There are many software applications that help in measuring and analysing the performance of control loops in industrial plants. Benchmarking the loop performance and identifying opportunities for improvement are key drivers for improving plant reliability, production throughput and safe operation.
