= David Angeli =

English engineer

David Angeli is Professor of Nonlinear Network Dynamics at Imperial College London.

== Biography ==
Angeli graduated from the University of Florence in 1996 with was awarded his PhD there in 2000. After working at Florence as an associate professor, Angeli joined Imperial College in 2008.

He was named Fellow of the Institute of Electrical and Electronics Engineers (IEEE) in January 2015 for contributions to nonlinear control theory. He became an IET fellow in December 2018 and received the Honeywell International Award of the Institute of Measurement and Control in November 2021.
