= Nikolay Gur'yevich Chetaev =

- Born: 6 December 1902; Karaduli, Laishevskiy uyezd, Kazan province, Russian Empire (now Tatarstan, Russia)
- Died: 17 October 1959 (aged 56); Moscow, Soviet Union
- Citizenship: USSR
- Education: Kazan University
- Known for: Outstanding contribution to the development of Mathematical Theory of Stability
- Scientific career
- Fields: Mathematical physics, analytical mechanics, differential equations
- Doctoral advisor: Dmitri Nikolajewitsch Seiliger

Nikolay Gur'yevich Chetaev (23 November 1902 – 17 October 1959) was a Russian Soviet mechanician and mathematician. He was born in Karaduli, Laishevskiy uyezd, Kazan province, Russian Empire (now Tatarstan of Russian Federation) and died in Moscow, USSR. He belongs to the Kazan school of mathematics.

== Biography ==
N. G. Chetaev graduated from Kazan University in 1924. His doctoral advisor was Professor Dmitri Nikolajewitsch Seiliger. At the suggestion of D. N. Seiliger in 1929 he came to Germany to do his postdoctoral research at Goettingen University and to study the scientific achievements of School of Aerodynamics of Professor Ludwig Prandtl.

From 1930 to 1940 N. G. Chetaev was a professor of Kazan University where he created a scientific school of the mathematical theory of stability of motion. The school consisted of thirty one of his doctoral students, direct followers and collaborators, among whom there are such prominent mathematicians as Nikolay Krasovsky and Valentin Rumyantsev. N. G. Chetaev initiated the formation of Department of Aerodynamics at Kazan University, on which base Kazan Aviation Institute was founded in 1932. In 1939 he was conferred a degree of Doctor of Science in Physics and Mathematics. From 1940 to 1959 he held a position of full professor at Moscow University. In 1940 N. G. Chetaev organized and became a head of Department of General Mechanics at Institute of Mechanics of Academy of Sciences of USSR (on 21 November 1991 renamed into Russian Academy of Sciences) that was opened in the same year. From 1945 to 1953 he was the director of the Institute.

== Research ==
During his research career N. G. Chetaev made a number of significant contributions to Mathematical Theory of Stability, Analytical Mechanics and Mathematical Physics. His major scientific achievements relates to as follows.

1. The Poincaré equations. They were first obtained by H. Poincaré in the case when the algebra of virtual displacements is transitive and the constraints do not depend explicitly on time, and he applied them to investigate the motion of a solid body with an ellipsoidal cavity, entirely filled by a uniformly vortex moving ideal fluid. N.G. Chetaev generalized and developed the theory of the Poincaré equations to the case where the algebra of displacements is intransitive and the constraints depend explicitly on time and also converted them to a simpler canonical form. Now they are called Chetaev equations. In particular, he gave a method for constructing the algebra of virtual and actual displacements when the holonomic constraints are given by a differential form and he introduced the important concept of cyclic displacements.
2. Lagrange’s theorem of stability of an equilibrium, Poincaré–Lyapunov theorem on a periodic motion & Chetaev's theorems. He established the theorem of instability for the equations of a perturbed motion. Working on the perturbations of stable motions of Hamiltonian system he formulated and proved the theorem of the properties of the Poincaré variational equations that states: “If the unperturbed motion of a holonomic potential system is stable, then, first, the characteristic numbers of all solutions of the variational equations are equal to zero, second, these equations are regular in the sense of Lyapunov and are reduced to a system of equations with constant coefficients and have a quadratic integral of definite sign”. The Chetaev's theorem generalizes the Lagrange's theorem on an equilibrium and the Poincaré–Lyapunov theorem on a periodic motion. According to the theorem, for a stable unperturbed motion of a potential system, an infinitely near perturbed motion has an oscillatory, wave-like, character.
3. Chetaev’s method of constructing Lyapunov functions as a coupling (combination) of first integrals. The previous result gave rise to and substantiated the Chetaev’s concept of constructing Lyapunov functions using first integrals initially implemented in his famous book “Stability of Motion” as a coupling of first integrals in quadratic form .
4. D'Alembert–Lagrange and Gauss Principles. Gauss principle is equivalent to the d'Alembert–Lagrange principle and is applicable both to holonomic and to nonholonomic systems. But according to P. Appell and E. Delassus (1911–1913) the study of nonlinear differential constraints proved these principles to be incompatible. The solution of this problem was completed by N.G. Chetaev (1932–1933), who proposed that the possible displacements of nonlinear constraints be defined by conditions of the special type. Thus, it has been generalized by three physicists, namely E. Mach (1883) who began to solve the problem with postulating one inequality out of two necessary, E. A. Bolotov (1916) who proved this postulate and N. G. Chetaev (1932–1933) who completed the work extended over 50 years.

== Awards ==
- Order of the Red Banner of Labour (1945).
- Order of Lenin (1953).
- Lenin Prize (1960, posthumously).
