= List of fellows of IEEE Control Systems Society =

The Fellow grade of membership is the highest level of membership, and cannot be applied for directly by the member – instead the candidate must be nominated by others. This grade of membership is conferred by the IEEE Board of Directors in recognition of a high level of demonstrated extraordinary accomplishment.

| Year | Fellow | Citation |
|---|---|---|
| 1968 | Jose B. Cruz Jr. | "For significant contributions in circuit theory and the sensitivity analysis of control systems" |
| 1970 | Thomas Kailath | "For inspired teaching of and contributions to information, communication, and control theory" |
| 1973 | Yu-Chi Ho | "For contributions to control theory and differential games" |
| 1977 | Walter Murray Wonham | "For contributions to multivariable control system theory and design" |
| 1978 | Jerry Mendel | "For contributions to system identification, state estimation, and their application to aerospace technology" |
| 1978 | George Moschytz | "For contributions to the theory and the development of hybrid-integrated linear communication networks" |
| 1979 | Sanjoy K. Mitter | "For contributions to optimization computation and control theory" |
| 1980 | Bernard Friedland | "For contributions to the application of modern control theory in navigation, guidance, and control systems" |
| 1983 | Mathukumalli Vidyasagar | "For contributions to the stability analysis of linear and nonlinear distributed systems" |
| 1983 | Tamer Başar | "For contributions to multiperson decision making and deterministic and stochastic dynamic game theory" |
| 1984 | John Baras | "For contributions to distributed parameter systems theory, quantum and nonlinear estimation, and control of queuing systems' |
| 1984 | Yaakov Bar-Shalom | "For contributions to the theory of stochastic systems and of multitarget tracking" |
| 1985 | Lennart Ljung | "For contributions to recursive parameter estimation and adaptive control' |
| 1985 | Jason Speyer | "For contributions to deterministic and stochastic optimal control theory and applications" |
| 1986 | Peter E. Caines | "For contributions to the theory of system identification and adaptive control" |
| 1986 | Graham Goodwin | "For contributions to adaptive control and systems identification" |
| 1987 | Alberto Isidori | "For fundamental contributions to nonlinear system theory" |
| 1987 | Vincent Poor | "For contributions to the theory of robust linear filtering applied to signal detection and estimation" |
| 1989 | Shankar Bhattacharyya | "For contributions to the analysis and design of linear control systems" |
| 1989 | Bruce Hajek | "For contributions to stochastic systems, communications networks, and control systems" |
| 1989 | Hassan K. Khalil | "For contributions to singular perturbation theory and its application to control" |
| 1989 | Anders Lindquist | "For contributions to filtering and estimation, stochastic control, and stochastic theory" |
| 1989 | Debasis Mitra | "For contributions to mathematical foundations of computer and communication system design and analysis" |
| 1989 | V. S. Ramachandran | "For contributions to theory of multivariable networks with applications to two-dimensional digital filters" |
| 1990 | Jane Cullum | "For contributions to practical numerical algorithms for large-scale systems" |
| 1990 | Mohamed E. El-Hawary | "For contributions to the theory of optimal economic operation of hydrothermal power systems' |
| 1990 | Arthur J. Krener | "For contributions to the control and estimation of nonlinear and causal systems" |
| 1990 | P. S. Krishnaprasad | "For contributions to geometric and nonlinear control and to engineering education" |
| 1991 | Robert R. Bitmead | "For contributions to the development of the theory of adaptive control and filtering" |
| 1991 | Ruth F. Curtain | "For contributions to the control theory of stochastic and infinite-dimensional systems" |
| 1992 | Ruzena Bajcsy | "For contributions to machine perception and robotics" |
| 1992 | Joe Chow | "For contributions to singular perturbation theory and its application to control and power systems" |
| 1993 | John Baillieul | "For contributions to nonlinear control theory, robotics, and control of complex mechanical systems" |
| 1993 | Suresh Joshi | "For contributions to the analysis and synthesis of control systems for large flexible spacecraft and for leadership in development design methodologies for advanced space systems" |
| 1993 | Eduardo D. Sontag | "For contributions to nonlinear system theory and feedback control" |
| 1994 | Petros A. Ioannou | "For contributions to the theory of robust adaptive control" |
| 1996 | Jacek M. Zurada | "For contributions to engineering education in the area of neural networks" |
| 1996 | John M. Hollerbach | "For contributions to autonomous robot calibration, novel robot systems, and human motor control" |
| 1996 | Mark Spong | "For contributions to the control of robot systems using nonlinear control techniques" |
| 1997 | Jessy Grizzle | "For contributions to the theory and practice of nonlinear control systems design" |
| 1997 | Harry Kwatny | "For contributions to control systems engineering" |
| 1998 | Ali Saberi | "For contributions to singular perturbation theory and nonlinear control" |
| 1998 | Yutaka Yamamoto | "For contributions to the theory of sampled-data systems, digital control, and infinite-dimensional systems" |
| 1999 | Gerard Gaynor | "For contributions to engineering and technology management" |
| 1999 | Marija D. Ilić | "For contributions to hierarchical electric power systems control and applications" |
| 1999 | Kenneth Loparo | "For contributions to stochastic stability and control theory with applications to engineering systems" |
| 1999 | John Tsitsiklis | "For contributions to the theory of control and computation in large-scale systems" |
| 2000 | George Cybenko | "For contributions to algorithms and theory of artificial neural networks in signal processing, and to theory and systems software for distributed and parallel computing" |
| 2000 | Tryphon T. Georgiou | "For contributions to the theory of robust control" |
| 2000 | Ian R. Petersen | "For contributions to the theory of robust control system design" |
| 2000 | Bruno Siciliano | "For contributions to dynamic modeling and control of robotic systems and for leadership in robotics education" |
| 2000 | Roberto Tempo | "For contributions to robust identification and control of uncertain systems" |
| 2000 | Antonio Vicino | "For contributions to identification and robust control of uncertain systems" |
| 2001 | Vincenzo Piuri | "For contributions to neural network techniques and embedded digital architectures for industrial applications" |
| 2001 | Bozenna Pasik-Duncan | "For contributions to identification and stochastic adaptive control" |
| 2002 | Anuradha Annaswamy | "For contributions to adaptive control theory, neural networks, and active-adaptive control of combustion systems" |
| 2002 | Siva Banda | "For leadership in developing and applying multivariable flight control techniques for military applications" |
| 2002 | Maria Domenica Di Benedetto | "For contributions to the theory of nonlinear and hybrid control system design" |
| 2002 | Miroslav Krstić | "For contributions to nonlinear and adaptive control" |
| 2002 | Malcolm C. Smith | "For contributions to feedback control and systems theory" |
| 2002 | Arjan van der Schaft | "For contributions to the theory of nonlinear systems" |
| 2003 | Okyay Kaynak | "For contributions to variable structure systems theory and its applications in mechatronics" |
| 2003 | Salvatore Monaco | "For contributions to nonlinear digital systems theory and control" |
| 2003 | Joseph O'Sullivan | "For contributions to information-theoretic imaging with applications to medical tomographic systems and radar imaging" |
| 2003 | Stephen Shing-Toung Yau | "For contributions to the mathematical aspects of nonlinear filtering" |
| 2003 | Rama Yedavalli | "For contributions to parameter robustness analysis of state space systems and robust control of linear uncertain systems" |
| 2004 | Jing Sun | "For contributions to systems theory and automotive powertrain control" |
| 2005 | Yoichi Hori | "For contributions to advanced motion control" |
| 2005 | Irena Lasiecka | "For contributions to boundary control systems" |
| 2005 | Manfred Morari | "For contributions to robust and model predictive control and control of hybrid systems" |
| 2005 | Dorothée Normand-Cyrot | "For contributions to discrete-time and digital nonlinear control systems" |
| 2005 | Innocent Kamwa | "For contributions to the identification of synchronous generator models and innovations in power grid control" |
| 2006 | Antonio Bicchi | "For contributions to automatic control of mechanisms and robots" |
| 2006 | Raphael Carl Lee | "For contributions to biophysics of cellular and tissue injury by electric currents and development of polymers for repair of cellular damage" |
| 2007 | Naomi Leonard | "For contributions to control of underwater vehicles" |
| 2007 | Ratnesh Kumar | "For contributions to discrete event system modeling, control, diagnosis and applications" |
| 2007 | Peter Magyar | "For contributions to digital control of electrical drive systems" |
| 2008 | Steven H. Low | "For contributions to internet congestion control" |
| 2008 | Jennie Si | For contributions to approximate dynamic programming, and to the analysis and synthesis of neural networks |
| 2008 | Roland Siegwart | "For contributions to mobile, networked, and micro-scale robots" |
| 2009 | Anna Stefanopoulou | "For contributions to control of energy conversion systems" |
| 2009 | Dawn Tilbury | "For leadership in networked and logic control systems" |
| 2010 | María Inés Valla | "For contributions to non-linear control of electric drives" |
| 2011 | Lino Guzzella | "For contributions to automotive control systems to reduce pollution emission and fuel consumption" |
| 2011 | Jay H. Lee | "For contributions to model-based predictive control applications" |
| 2011 | Jan Maciejowski | "For contributions to system identification and control |
| 2011 | Anna Scaglione | "For contributions to filterbank precoding for wireless transmission and signal processing for cooperative sensor networks" |
| 2011 | Leyuan Shi | "For contributions to optoelectronic packaging technologies" |
| 2011 | Claire J. Tomlin | "For contributions to hybrid control systems with applications to air traffic management, unmanned aerial vehicles, and systems biology" |
| 2011 | Masaru Uchiyama | "For contributions to design, modeling, and control of robotic structures" |
| 2012 | John Nelson Chiasson | "For contributions to control of electric machines and power converters" |
| 2012 | Venkataramanan Balakrishnan | "For contributions to convex optimization in control systems" |
| 2012 | Marco Claudio Campi | "For contributions to stochastic and randomized methods in systems and control" |
| 2012 | Marimuthu Palaniswami | "For contributions to computational intelligence, learning systems, and nonlinear modeling" |
| 2012 | Lucy Pao | "For contributions to feedforward and feedback control systems" |
| 2012 | Maria Elena Valcher | "For contributions to positive systems theory and the behavioral approach to system analysis and control" |
| 2012 | Le Yi Wang | "For contributions to system identification and the analysis of system complexity" |
| 2012 | Junshan Zhang | "For contributions to cross-layer optimization of wireless networks" |
| 2013 | Håkan Hjalmarsson | "For contributions to data-based controller design |
| 2013 | Yi Ma | "For contributions to computer vision and pattern recognition" |
| 2013 | Kameshwar Poolla | "For contributions to system identification, robust control, and applications to semiconductor manufacturing" |
| 2013 | Yuan Wang | "For contributions to stability and control of nonlinear systems" |
| 2014 | Kwok Cheung | "For development and implementation of energy and market management systems for control centers" |
| 2014 | Jorge Cortes | "For contributions to geometric control, nonsmooth dynamical systems, and distributed control of multi-agent systems" |
| 2014 | Huijun Gao | "For contributions to the theory and industrial applications of networked control systems" |
| 2014 | Fernando Paganini | "For contributions to robust control and communication networks" |
| 2014 | Ioannis Paschalidis | "For contributions to the control and optimization of communication and sensor networks, manufacturing systems, and biological systems" |
| 2014 | Cheryl B. Schrader | "For leadership and contributions in engineering education" |
| 2014 | Kazuo Tanaka | "For contributions to fuzzy control system design and analysis" |
| 2014 | Galip Ulsoy | "For contributions to the control of automotive and manufacturing systems and time-delay systems" |
| 2014 | Zidong Wang | "For contributions to networked control and complex networks" |
| 2015 | Michael Demetriou | "For contributions to estimation and optimization of distributed parameter systems" |
| 2015 | Sanjay Lall | "For contributions to control of networked systems" |
| 2015 | Mehran Mesbahi | "For contributions to networked control systems" |
| 2015 | Kiyoshi Ohishi | "For contributions to development of fast and robust motion control systems" |
| 2015 | Spiridon Reveliotis | "For contributions to discrete event systems for resource allocation" |
| 2015 | Peng Shi | "For contributions to control and filtering techniques for hybrid dynamical systems" |
| 2015 | Johan Suykens | "For developing the least squares support vector machines" |
| 2015 | Harry Trentelman | "For contributions to geometric theory of linear systems and behavioral models" |
| 2015 | Huaguang Zhang | "For contributions to stability analysis of recurrent neural networks and intelligent control of nonlinear systems" |
| 2016 | Thor I. Fossen | "For contributions to modelling and controlling of marine crafts" |
| 2016 | Maurice Heemels | "For contributions to analysis and design of hybrid, networked, and event-triggered systems" |
| 2016 | Pablo Parrilo | "For contributions to semidefinite and sum-of-squares optimization" |
| 2016 | Wei Ren | "For contributions to distributed coordination and control of multi-agent systems" |
| 2016 | Carlos Canudas de Wit | "For contributions to modeling and control of mechanical, robotic, and networked systems" |
| 2016 | Luca Zaccarian | "For contributions to the development and application of nonlinear and hybrid control systems" |
| 2017 | Linda Bushnell | "For contributions to networked control systems" |
| 2017 | Calin Belta | "For contributions to automated control synthesis and robot motion planning and control" |
| 2017 | Maria Pia Fanti | "For contributions to modeling and control of discrete event systems" |
| 2017 | Kristin Ytterstad Pettersen | "For contributions to control of marine vessels and snake robots" |
| 2017 | Xiaobo Tan | "For contributions to modeling and control of smart materials and underwater robots" |
| 2018 | Bijnan Bandyopadhyay | "For contributions to discrete-time, multi-rate, output feedback sliding-mode control" |
| 2018 | Fariba Fahroo | "For contributions to computational optimal control theory" |
| 2018 | Naira Hovakimyan | "For contributions to control with applications to aerospace and robotic systems" |
| 2018 | Jonathan How | "For contributions to guidance and control of air and space vehicles" |
| 2018 | Sonia Martínez Díaz | "For contributions to the geometric mechanics and control" |
| 2018 | Karen Rudie | "For contributions to the supervisory control theory of discrete event systems" |
| 2019 | Bart De Schutter | "For contributions to optimal control of discrete-event and hybrid systems" |
| 2019 | Maurizio Porfiri | "For contributions to biomimetic robotics" |
| 2019 | Mario Sznaier | "For contributions to identification of switched systems and multiobjective control" |
| 2019 | Min Wu | "For contribution to control and automation for complex systems" |
| 2020 | Antonella Ferrara | "For contributions to sliding mode control theory" |
| 2020 | Sonja Glavaski | "For leadership in energy systems" |
| 2020 | Sandra Hirche | "For contributions to human-machine interaction and networked control" |
| 2020 | Kirsten Morris | "For contributions to control and estimator design for infinite-dimensional systems" |
| 2020 | Yasamin Mostofi | "For contributions to control and communications co-optimization in mobile sensor networks" |
| 2020 | Maria Prandini | "For contributions to stochastic, hybrid and distributed control systems theory" |
| 2020 | Sarah Spurgeon | "For contributions to variable structure control and estimation" |
| 2021 | Jacquelien Scherpen | "For contributions to nonlinear model reduction and passivity-based control" |
| 2022 | Bonnie Ferri | "For contributions to hands-on learning and leadership in higher education" |
| 2023 | Carolyn Beck | "For contributions to model reduction and to the analysis of epidemic processes over networks" |
| 2023 | Hong Chen | "For contributions to predictive control and applications in automotive systems" |
| 2024 | Mariagrazia Dotoli | "For contributions to control of logistics systems in smart cities " |
| 2025 | Lacra Pavel | "For contributions to game theory, control, and optimization for network systems" |
| 2026 | Na Li | "For contributions to control, learning, and optimization and applications to energy and biomedical systems" |
| 2026 | Simona Onori | "For contributions to energy systems modeling, control, and optimization" |
| 2026 | Necmiye Ozay | "For fundamental contributions to control and identification of cyber-physical and hybrid systems" |
| 2026 | Somayeh Sojoudi | "For contributions to optimization and learning techniques for complex systems" |

== See also ==
- List of IEEE Fellows
