= Dimitriou =

Dimitriou or Demetriou (Greek: Δημητρίου) is a Greek patronymic surname, meaning "child of Demetrios". Notable people with the surname include:

- Andreas Demetriou (born 1950) Greek Cypriot developmental psychologist and a former Minister of Education and Culture of Cyprus
- Andrew Demetriou (born 1961), chief executive officer of the Australian Football League
- Angela Dimitriou (born 1954), Greek pop folk singer
- Anna Demetriou (born 1993), English actress, singer, songwriter, and livestreamer
- Christos Demetriou, musician, songwriter, record producer and entrepreneur
- Cleo Demetriou (born 2001), stage actress
- Harriet Demetriou, Filipino lawyer and first Chairwoman of the Philippine election commission, the COMELEC
- Harry Demetriou (born 1958), British poker player
- Ioannis Dimitriou (1826 – c.1900), Greek archaeologist and merchant
- Jamie Demetriou (born c.1987), actor and writer
- Jason Demetriou (rugby league) (born 1976), Australian born Canadian/Greek rugby league footballer and coach
- Jason Demetriou (footballer) (born 1987), English-born Cypriot footballer who plays for Anorthosis Famagusta
- Kyriacos Demetriou (1919–1999), New York City barber
- Michael Demetriou, American aerospace engineer
- Mickey Demetriou (born 1990), English footballer
- Natasia Demetriou (born 1983/84), English comedian and actress
- Panayiotis Demetriou (born 1939) Cypriot politician and Member of the European Parliament for the European People's Party
- Steve Demetriou, American politician from Ohio
