= Mariagrazia Dotoli =

Italian systems engineer

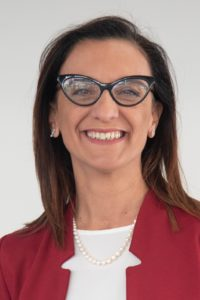
- Education: Politecnico di Bari
- Known for: Control of logistics systems in smart cities
- Awards: Fellow. IEEE. 2024
- Scientific career
- Fields: Control and System Engineering
- Workplaces: Politecnico di Bari
- Website: http://dclab.poliba.it/people/mariagrazia-dotoli/

Mariagrazia Dotoli (born 1971) is an Italian systems engineer and control theorist whose research involves the optimization of supply chain management and traffic control in smart cities, fuzzy control systems, and the use of Petri nets in modeling these applications as discrete event dynamic systems. She is Professor in Systems and Control Engineering in the Department of Electrical and Information Engineering at the Polytechnic University of Bari.

== Education ==
Dotoli is the daughter of Giovanni Dotoli, an Italian scholar of French literature; she was born in 1971 in Bari. She was educated at the Liceo Scientifico Statale Arcangelo Scacchi and at the Polytechnic University of Bari, where she earned a laurea in 1995, after a year working with Bernadette Bouchon-Meunier at Pierre and Marie Curie University in Paris. She went on to earn a professional engineering qualification in 1996 and to complete a Ph.D. in 1999. Her doctoral dissertation, Recent Developments of the Fuzzy Control Methodology, was supervised by Bruno Maione; her doctoral research also included work with Jan Jantzen at the Technical University of Denmark.

== Career ==
She remained at the Polytechnic University of Bari as an assistant professor beginning in 1999, and despite winning a national qualification to be a full professor in 2013, remained an assistant until 2015. She became an associate professor from 2015 to 2019, and has been a full professor since 2019. She also served the university as vice chancellor for research from 2012 to 2013. Since 2022 she is the Coordination and founder of the Italian National PhD program in Autonomous Systems, with administrative seat at Politecnico di Bari and 25 affiliated Italian Universities. In 2020 she was the founder of the Interuniversity Italian PhD Program in Industry 4.0 of Politecnico di Bari and University of Bari, Italy. She was the coordinator of this PhD program in years 2020-2022. She is the founder and scientific responsible for the Decision and Control Laboratory at the Department of Electrical and Information Engineering of Polytechnic of Bari since 2012.

== Editorial activities ==
She has been senior editor of the international journal IEEE Transactions on Automation Science and Engineering for the term 2021–2025; she has been an associate editor of the international journals IEEE Transactions on Systems Man and Cybernetics, IEEE Transactions on Control Systems Technology, and IEEE Robotics and Automation Letters. From 2016 to 2020 she was editor-in-chief of the international newsletter IEEE Systems Man and Cybernetics Society eNewsletter. She was general chair for the 29th Mediterranean Conference on Control and Automation (Bari, June 2021), and she is currently holding such role for the upcoming IEEE 20th International Conference on Automation Science and Engineering (CASE24).

== Publications ==
She has authored more than 300 articles in international conferences, journals, and book chapters. She is the author of a MATLAB manual for engineering applications, together with Maria Pia Fanti.

== Recognitions ==
Dotoli was named an IEEE Fellow, in the 2024 class of fellows, "for contributions to control of logistics systems in smart cities". She is also a fellow of the Asia-Pacific Artificial Intelligence Association. She has been the recipient of the IEEE Systems Man and Cybernetics Society (SMCS) 2021 Outstanding Contribution Award for her service to SMCS as 2016-2020 Editor in Chief of the SMCS newsletter and of the SMCS 2021 Award for Most Active SMCS Technical Committee in Systems – Technical Committee (TC) on Intelligent Systems for Human-Aware Sustainability as co-chair of the TC. Prof. Dotoli is listed in the world top 2% scientists list for career-long impact and single-year categories in the “Industrial Engineering & Automation” and “Artificial Intelligence & Image Processing” fields.
