= Chen Hong =

Chen Hong is the name of:

- Chen Hong (painter) (fl. 8th century), Tang dynasty imperial court painter
- Chen Hong (actress) (born 1968), Chinese actress
- Chen Hong (softball) (born 1970), Chinese softball player
- Chen Hong (badminton) (born 1979), Chinese badminton player
- Chen Hong (figure skater) (born 1994), Chinese ice dancer
- Chen Jian Hong (born 1975), Taiwanese racing driver
- Hong Chen (engineer) (Chinese: 陈虹, born 1963), Chinese control theorist

== See also ==
- Hong Chen (born 1991), Chinese pop singer
