= Rudie =

Rudie is an abbreviation for the name Rudolph. It may also refer to:

== People with given name ==
- Rudie Dane, competitor on The Bachelorette (season 10)
- Rudie Hermann Kuiter (born 1943), Australian underwater photographer
- Rudie Kemna (born 1967), Dutch cyclist
- Rudie Liebrechts (born 1941), Dutch speed skater
- Rudie Lubbers (born 1945), Dutch boxer
- Rudie Ramli (born 1982), Malaysian footballer
- Rudie M. Saltness (1899-1974), American politician
- Rudie Sypkes (1950–2008), Australian businessman
- Rudie van Vuuren, Namibian physician, conservationist and sportsman

== People with surname ==
- Evelyn Rudie (born 1949), American playwright and actress
- Karen Rudie (born 1963), Canadian electrical engineer

== Fictional characters ==
- Rudie, band manager in animated children's television series Kuu Kuu Harajuku

== Slang and popular culture ==
- Rudie, synonym of rude boy, Jamaican and UK youth subculture
- Rudie blues, music genre that was a precursor to reggae and ska
- Rudie Can't Fail, reggae-influenced song about rude boys by the Clash
