= Chiasson =

Chiasson is a French surname which means 'of Chiasso' as it originated in the municipality of Chiasso on the Swiss/Italian border.

Notable people with the surname include:

- Alex Chiasson (born 1990), Canadian ice hockey player
- Dan Chiasson (born 1971), American poet and critic
- Herménégilde Chiasson (born 1946), Canadian playwright and poet
- John Nelson Chiasson (1952–2025), American engineer
- Macy Chiasson (born 1991), American mixed martial artist
- Paul Chiasson, Canadian architect
- Scott Chiasson (born 1977), American baseball player
- Steve Chiasson (1967–1999), Canadian ice hockey player
- Warren Chiasson (born 1934), Canadian jazz vibraphonist
