= Onori =

Onori is an Italian surname. Notable people with the surname include:

- Bernardo Onori (born 1946), Italian boxer
- Federica Onori (born 1988), Italian politician
- Simona Onori, Italian engineer
