= Prandini =

Prandini is an Italian surname. Notable people with this name include:

- Giovanni Prandini (1940–2018), Italian politician
- Jenna Prandini (born 1992), American track and field athlete
- Maria Prandini (born 1969), Italian electrical engineer
