= Necmiye Ozay =

Turkish-American electrical engineer

Necmiye Ozay is a Turkish and American control theorist. Her research has ranged from the theory of system identification and the use of mathematical logic to specify control problems, to applied work on vehicle cruise control. She is a professor in the Department of Electrical Engineering and Computer Science and the Robotics Department at the University of Michigan.

== Education and career ==
Ozay was a student of electrical and electronics engineering at Boğaziçi University in Istanbul, where she received her bachelor's degree in 2004. After a 2006 master's degree in electrical engineering from the Pennsylvania State University, she continued her studies at Northeastern University in Boston, completing her Ph.D. in 2010. Her dissertation, Convex Relaxations for Robust Identification of Hybrid Models, was supervised by Mario Sznaier.

Next, she became a postdoctoral researcher at the California Institute of Technology from 2010 to 2013. She became a faculty member at the University of Michigan in 2013, and was tenured as an associate professor in 2019. She was Chen-Luan Family Faculty Development Professor from 2023 to 2025.

== Recognition ==
Ozay was the 2021 recipient of the Antonio Ruberti Young Researcher Prize of the IEEE Control Systems Society, and named to the 2026 class of IEEE Fellows, both given "for fundamental contributions to control and identification of hybrid and cyber-physical systems".
