= Boolean differential calculus =

Subject field of Boolean algebra discussing changes of Boolean variables and functions

Boolean differential calculus (BDC) (German: Boolescher Differentialkalkül (BDK)) is a subject field of Boolean algebra discussing changes of Boolean variables and Boolean functions.

Boolean differential calculus concepts are analogous to those of classical differential calculus, notably studying the changes in functions and variables with respect to each other.

The Boolean differential calculus allows various aspects of dynamical systems theory such as automata theory on finite automata, Petri net theory, and supervisory control theory (SCT), to be discussed in a united and closed form, with their individual advantages combined.

== History and applications ==
Originally inspired by the design and testing of switching circuits and the use of error-correcting codes in electrical engineering, the roots for the development of what later would evolve into the Boolean differential calculus were initiated by works of Irving S. Reed, David E. Muller, David A. Huffman, Sheldon B. Akers Jr. and A. D. Talantsev (A. D. Talancev, А. Д. Таланцев) between 1954 and 1959, and of Frederick F. Sellers Jr., Mu-Yue Hsiao, and Leroy W. Bearnson in 1968.

Since then, significant advances were accomplished in both, the theory and in the application of the BDC in switching circuit design and logic synthesis.

Works of André Thayse, Marc Davio, and Jean-Pierre Deschamps in the 1970s formed the basics of BDC on which Dieter Bochmann, Christian Posthoff, and Bernd Steinbach further developed BDC into a self-contained mathematical theory later on.

A complementary theory of Boolean integral calculus (German: Boolescher Integralkalkül) has been developed as well.

BDC has also found uses in discrete event dynamic systems (DEDS) in digital network communication protocols.

Meanwhile, BDC has seen extensions to multi-valued variables and functions as well as to lattices of Boolean functions.

== Overview ==
Boolean differential operators play a significant role in BDC. They allow the application of differentials as known from classical analysis to be extended to logical functions.

The differential $dx$ of a Boolean variable $x$ models the relation

$$dx = \begin{cases}
0,  & \text{no change of } x\\
1, & \text{change of } x
\end{cases}$$

There are no constraints in regard to the nature, the causes, and consequences of a change.

The differential $dx$ is binary and can be used just like common binary variables.

== See also ==
- Boolean Algebra
- Boole's expansion theorem
- Ramadge–Wonham framework
