= Rangasami L. Kashyap =

Indian applied mathematician (1938–2022)

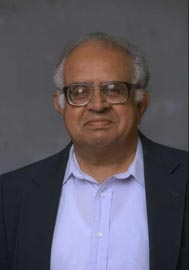
- Born: 28 March 1938
- Died: 11 November 2022 (aged 84)
- Education: Harvard University; Indian Institute of Science; University of Mysore
- Awards: Padma Shri (2021)
- Scientific career
- Fields: Pattern recognition
- Workplaces: Purdue University
- Thesis: Pattern classification and switching theory (1965)
- Doctoral advisor: Yu-Chi Ho
- Doctoral students: Mei-Ling Shyu; Birsen Yazıcı

Rangasami Lakshminarayan Kashyap (28 March 1938 – 11 November 2022) was an Indian applied mathematician and a Professor of Electrical Engineering at Purdue University.

He developed (with Harvard professor Yu-Chi Ho) the Ho-Kashyap rule, an important result (algorithm) in pattern recognition.

In 1982, he presented the Kashyap information criterion (KIC) to select the best model from a set of mathematical candidate models with different numbers of unknown parameters. These parameters are adjusted to adapt the models to data (observations) that have trends and statistical variation in the measured values.

He is a Fellow of the Institute of Electrical and Electronics Engineers, the International Association for Pattern Recognition, and the Indian Institute of Electronic and Telecommunication Engineers.

In the field of Vedic studies, he has made contribution including the complete translation into English all the four major and most ancient collection of verses in Sanskrit namely Rigveda Samhita, Krishna Yajurveda Samhita, and Samaveda, and Atharvaveda, consisting together of about 25000 metrical verses in the Sanskrit of Vedas (different from classical Sanskrit).

Kashyap is the only person in the world to translate all the 4 vedas recognizing his achievement he was honored by the Govt. of India with the Padma Shri award in 2021 under the Literature and Education field.

Kashyap died on 11 November 2022, at the age of 84.

== Biography ==
=== Education ===
Prof. Rangasami L. Kashyap received his early education from the National College, Bangalore, Central College, and at the Indian Institute of Science (the degrees of ME and DIISc). He was awarded the distinguished alumni award from IISc in 2010. Prof. Kashyap received his Ph.D. from Harvard in 1966.

=== Career ===
Prof. Kashyap served as a Professor Emeritus of Electrical and Computer Engineering, at Purdue University, USA and was also the director of the Sri Aurobindo Kapali Sastry Institute of Vedic Culture. While at Purdue, he has published more than 200 research papers in advanced scientific Journals and delivered more than 200 papers at National and International conference, including several keynote speeches.

=== Awards ===
Prof. Kashyap received the IAPR King-Sun Fu Prize in 1990 for fundamental contributions to pattern recognition. He was also awarded the Rajyotsava Prashasti Award in 2012 by the Govt. of Karnataka.

== Selected publications ==
=== Thesis ===
- Kashyap, R. L. (1965). Pattern classification and switching theory. PhD thesis, written under Yu-Chi Ho.

=== Articles ===
- Kashyap, R.L. 1982; Optimal choice of AR and MA parts in autoregressive moving average models; Article printed in IEEE Transactions on Pattern Analysis and Machine Intelligence (PAMI); Published by IEEE; March 1982; volume PAMI-4(2); pages 99–104; doi:10.1109/TPAMI.1982.4767213
- Ho, Y.C. and Kashyap, R.L. 1965; An algorithm for linear inequalities and its applications; Article printed in IEEE Trans. Electron. Comput.; Published by IEEE; 1965; volume 14 (5); pages 683–688; https://ieeexplore.ieee.org/xpls/abs_all.jsp?4038553 ; doi:10.1109/PGEC.1965.264207 ; Access date 19 May 2008
