= Birsen Yazıcı =

Turkish-American electrical engineer

Birsen Yazıcı is a Turkish-American electrical engineer whose research interests include imaging radar, the use of optical tomography in biomedical applications, and the remote diagnosis of faults in electromechanical machinery. She is a professor at the Rensselaer Polytechnic Institute, in the Department of Electrical, Computer & Systems Engineering and the Department of Biomedical Engineering.

== Education and career ==
Yazıcı studied electrical engineering and mathematics as an undergraduate at Boğaziçi University in Istanbul, graduating in 1988. She went to Purdue University for graduate study, where she earned a master's degree in 1990 and completed her Ph.D. in 1994. Her dissertation, Second-order stationary statistical models for inverse frequency processes, was supervised by Rangasami L. Kashyap.

After several years as a research engineer for General Electric, Yazıcı returned to academia in 2001 as an assistant professor of electrical and computer engineering at Drexel University. She moved to her present position at the Rensselaer Polytechnic Institute in 2003.

== Recognition ==
In 2021, Yazıcı was elected as an IEEE Fellow, "for contributions to synthetic aperture radar and passive imaging".
