= Eelume =

Autonomous underwater vehicle being developed by Eelume AS

The Eelume is an autonomous underwater vehicle being developed by Eelume AS, in partnership with Kongsberg Maritime and Equinor.

== Function ==
The Eelume is primarily designed to inspect, maintain and repair subsea infrastructure, primarily for offshore drilling installations. It may also have military applications, including for mine countermeasures and undersea surveillance.

The Eelume is intended to be able to dive 500 meters beneath the surface.

The Eelume is designed to be either entirely autonomous, or capable of being controlled remotely by an operator. The Eelume is intended to be deployed permanently underwater, housed at subsea docking stations.

== Development ==
The Eelume was tested at the PREZIOSO Linjebygg Subsea Test Center near Trondheim in November and December 2016. Eelume CEO Arne Kjørsvik has said they anticipate the vehicle being available on the market in late 2019.

The company designing Eelume began in 2015 as a spinoff from the Norwegian University of Science and Technology (NTNU), founded by a team of entrepreneurs including NTNU professor Kristin Ytterstad Pettersen.

== Popular culture ==
The device plays an important role in the Norwegian film production The burning sea (2021) directed by John Andreas Anderson.
