= Mei-Ling Shyu =

Computer scientist

Mei-Ling Shyu is a Taiwanese computer scientist whose research involves deep learning for multimedia-related big data analytics. She is a professor of electrical and computer engineering at the University of Missouri–Kansas City.

== Education and career ==
Shyu was an undergraduate at Feng Chia University in Taiwan, where she earned a degree in traffic and transportation engineering and management in 1986. She went to Purdue University for graduate study, completing a Ph.D. in electrical and computer engineering in 1999. Along the way, she also earned three master's degrees, in computer science in 1992, in electrical engineering in 1995, and in restaurant, hotel, institutional and tourism management in 1997. Her doctoral dissertation, A probabilistic network-based mechanism for multimedia database searching and data warehousing, was supervised by Rangasami L. Kashyap.

She joined the University of Miami as an assistant professor in 2000, and was promoted to associate professor in 2005 and to full professor in 2013. She moved to the University of Missouri–Kansas City in 2022.

== Recognition ==
In 2012, Shyu received the Technical Achievement Award of the IEEE Computer Society "for pioneering contributions to multimedia data mining, management and retrieval".

Shyu was elected as a Fellow of the Society for Information Reuse and Integration in 2010, "for contributions to multimedia data mining, information retrieval, knowledge management, and outstanding service to SIRI". Two years later, she was selected an ACM Distinguished Member.

She was elected as a AAAS Fellow in 2017, and as an IEEE Fellow, in the 2019 class of fellows, "for contributions to multimedia big data analytics and management". She was elected to the College of Fellows of the American Institute for Medical and Biological Engineering in 2021, "for outstanding contributions to the development of machine learning and computational algorithms with applications in bioengineering".

== Books ==
Shyu is the coauthor of the books Multimedia Data Engineering Applications and Processing (IGI Global, 2013, with Shu-Ching Chen) and Methods and Innovations for Multimedia Database Content Management (IGI Global, 2012, with Shu-Ching Chen).
