= Spiridon Reveliotis =

Engineering researcher

Spiridon Reveliotis is an engineer at the Georgia Institute of Technology in Atlanta. He was named a Fellow of the Institute of Electrical and Electronics Engineers (IEEE) in 2015 for his contributions to discrete event systems for resource allocation.
