= Yu-Chi Ho =

American control theorist

Yu-Chi "Larry" Ho
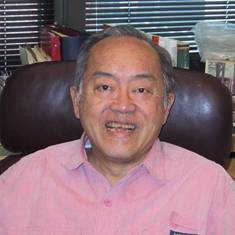
- Born: March 1, 1934 (age 92); Shanghai, China
- Education: Massachusetts Institute of Technology (BS, MS); Harvard University (PhD)
- Awards: Richard E. Bellman Control Heritage Award (1999); Rufus Oldenburger Medal (1999); IEEE Control Systems Science and Engineering Award; NAE Member; CAE Member; CAS Member
- Scientific career
- Fields: Applied mathematics Control theory
- Workplaces: Harvard University
- Thesis: A Study of the Optimal Control of Dynamic Systems
- Doctoral advisor: Arthur E. Bryson, Jr.; Kumpati S. Narendra
- Doctoral students: Ashok Kumar Agrawala; Rangasami L. Kashyap; Leyuan Shi

Yu-Chi "Larry" Ho (Chinese: 何毓琦; pinyin: Hé Yùqí; born March 1, 1934) is a Chinese-American mathematician, control theorist, and a professor at the School of Engineering and Applied Sciences, Harvard University.

He is the co-author of Applied Optimal Control, and an influential researcher in differential games, pattern recognition, and discrete event dynamic systems.

Ho was elected a member of the National Academy of Engineering in 1987 for pioneering and sustained contributions to applied optimization, control, and systems engineering theory and application.

== Biography ==
=== Education ===
Yu-Chi Ho was born on March 1, 1934, in Shanghai, China, and left home at the age of 15 in 1949 to complete his high school education in Hong Kong. In 1950, Ho enrolled at the Massachusetts Institute of Technology, where he graduated with a B.S. in electrical engineering in the summer of 1953 at the age of 19. Ho later reported that his initial interests were in mechanical engineering, due to a childhood experience repairing a European ornamental clock without any previous knowledge of its mechanisms. His application to MIT mechanical engineering, however, was routed to the electrical engineering department by mistake, and Ho decided to stay in the department. Ho continued his graduate studies at MIT, receiving a M.S. degree in electrical engineering in 1955.

After working for Bendix Aviation for three years, Ho moved to Harvard University in 1958, where he completed a Ph.D. in applied mathematics in 1961. His thesis A Study of the Optimal Control of Dynamic Systems was advised by Arthur E. Bryson, Jr. and Kumpati S. Narendra.

=== Career ===
After finishing his Ph.D. in the spring of 1961, Yu-Chi Ho returned to Harvard in the fall of 1961 for a teaching appointment, receiving tenure in 1965, and remained in the School of Engineering and Applied Sciences until his retirement in 2001. At Harvard, Ho held the title of Gordon McKay Professor of Systems Engineering, Emeritus, as well as the T. Jefferson Coolidge Chair of Applied Mathematics, Emeritus. He was also the visiting professor to the Cockrell Family Regent's Chair in Engineering at the University of Texas, Austin in 1989. In 2001, Ho retired from teaching duties at Harvard after 40 years of service and became a Research Professor. He was appointed (part-time) the Chair Professor and Chief Scientist at the Center for Intelligent and Networked Systems (CFINS), Department of Automation, Tsinghua University. In his career, he has supervised 50 Ph.D. students at Harvard and 3 students at Tsinghua.

=== Professional activities ===
Yu-Chi Ho is a member of the U.S. National Academy of Engineering and a foreign member of the Chinese Academy of Engineering and the Chinese Academy of Sciences. He is also an IEEE Life Fellow and an INFORMS Inaugural Fellow, and a Distinguished Member of the IEEE Control Systems Society. In addition to services on various governmental and industrial panels, and professional society administrative bodies, he was the program chairman for the IEEE Conference on Decision and Control 1972, the general chairman of the IEEE Robotics and Automation Conference 1987, and President of the IEEE Robotics & Automation Society in 1988. Ho co-founded Network Dynamics, Inc., a software firm specializing in industrial automation. He is on the editorial boards of several international journals and is the founding editor-in-chief of the international Journal on Discrete Event Dynamic Systems.

=== Community service ===
Yu-Chi Ho was the founder and the first chair of the annual United Asian American Dinner of Massachusetts. He also served as the Chairman of the Board of Greater Boston Chinese Cultural Association from 1995 to 1998, the President of the New England Chapter of the Organization of Chinese Americans from 1982 to 1985, a board member of the Mass Endowment for Humanities from 1985 to 1989, and a founding member and member of the steering committee of the 80-20 Initiative, a national political movement for Asian Americans.

=== Honors and awards ===
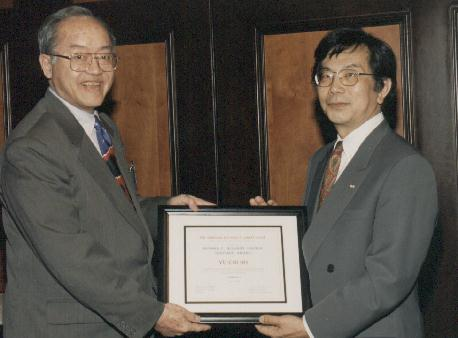
Yu-Chi Ho accepting the American Automatic Control Council Richard E. Bellman Control Heritage Award in 1999.

- Guggenheim Fellowship (1970)
- IEEE Control Systems Science and Engineering Award (1989)
- Chiang Technology Achievement Award (1993)
- Richard E. Bellman Control Heritage Award from the American Automatic Control Council (1999)
- Rufus Oldenburger Medal from the American Society of Mechanical Engineers (1999)
- 2002 class of Fellows of the Institute for Operations Research and the Management Sciences
- Isaacs Award from the International Society of Dynamic Games (2004)
- Member, US National Academy of Engineering
- Foreign member, China Academy of Engineering
- Foreign member, China Academy of Sciences

=== Personal life ===
Ho became a naturalized citizen of the United States in 1961. He and his wife Sophia have three children, six grand children, and one great-grandchild. They currently reside in Lexington, Massachusetts. Since April 25, 2007, Ho blogs on ScienceNet.cn, a science blog network sponsored by the Chinese Academy of Engineering and the Academy of Sciences.

== Work ==
=== Control theory and optimization ===
Yu-Chi Ho's research in control theory began when he was a graduate student at MIT. His 1955 paper time-domain compensation for closed-loop systems by a delay line method presented a new approach to the synthesis and analysis of closed-loop systems in the time domain. Ho collaborated with Rudolf E. Kálmán, a pioneer of modern control theory. Before Kálmán, time series analysis and classical control theory studied the frequency domain, using harmonic analysis, especially Laplace and Fourier transforms. Kálmán developed the study of the time domain using state-space models. Joining Kálmán, Ho showed that the state-space representation provides a convenient and compact way to model and analyze dynamical systems with multiple inputs and outputs which would otherwise take multiple Laplace transforms to encode; further, the state-space representation can be extended into nonlinear systems. Their paper controllability of linear dynamic systems, developed the theory of controllability (then known as the "Kalman-Bertram condition").

Together with Ho's student Robert Lee at MIT, the paper A Bayesian approach to problems in stochastic estimation and control formulated a general class of stochastic estimation and control problems from a Bayesian Decision-Theoretic viewpoint.

=== Pattern recognition ===
After joining the faculty of Harvard University, Ho developed the Ho-Kashyap rule in pattern recognition with his first Ph.D. student, Rangasami L. Kashyap.

=== Game theory ===
Turning his attention to game theory, Ho in 1965 published the paper Differential Games and Optimal Pursuit-Evasion Strategies, that proved the optimality of a proportional guidance scheme. His paper Nonzero Sum Differential Games was an influential game-theoretic study in systems and control, following earlier work by Samuel Karlin, for example.

=== Discrete event dynamic systems ===
Since the 1970s, Ho focused on research in discrete event dynamic systems, making contributions in perturbation analysis and ordinal optimization, including the book Perturbation Analysis of Discrete Event Dynamic Systems. and the book "Ordinal Optimization - Soft Optimization for Hard Problems" (Springer 2007)

== Publications ==
=== Books ===
- Bryson, A.E.; Ho, Y.C. (1975). Applied optimal control. Washington, DC: Hemisphere. ISBN 978-0-89116-228-5.
- Ho, Y.C.; Cao, X.R. (1991). Discrete Event Dynamic Systems and Perturbation Analysis. Kiuwer Aca-demic Publishers, Boston. ISBN 978-0-89116-228-5.
- Ho, Y.C.; Zhao, Q.C; Jia, Q.S. (2007). Ordinal Optimization: Soft Optimization for Hard Problems. Berlin: Springer. ISBN 978-0-387-37232-7.

=== About Yu-Chi Ho's work ===
- Gong, W.B.; Yao, D.D. (1999). "An Appreciation of Professor Yu-Chi Ho". Journal of Optimization Theory and Applications. 100 (3): 453–456. doi:10.1023/A:1022674003827. S2CID 120945849.
