= Françoise Lamnabhi-Lagarrigue =

French control theorist

Françoise Lamnabhi-Lagarrigue (born 31 December 1953) is a French control theorist, retired from the French National Centre for Scientific Research as an emeritus distinguished research fellow.

== Education and career ==
Lamnabhi-Lagarrigue was born on Lamnabhi-Lagarrigue31 December 1953 in Toulouse. She earned a master's degree in mathematics through Paul Sabatier University in Toulouse in 1976, and then moved to Paris-Sud University, where she earned a diplôme d'études approfondies in signal processing in 1978, a PhD in 1980, and a habilitation in 1985.

She became a researcher for the French National Centre for Scientific Research (CNRS) in 1980, and by 2018 had become a distinguished research fellow for the CNRS, affiliated with the Signals and Systems Laboratory at Paris-Sud University, before retiring as emeritus distinguished research fellow in 2020.

She is editor-in-chief of the journal Annual Reviews in Control.

== Recognition ==
Lamnabhi-Lagarrigue won the Prix Michel-Monpetit of the French Academy of Sciences in 2008. She became a knight of the Legion of Honour, and a Fellow of the International Federation of Automatic Control (IFAC) "for contributions to observer and controller design methodologies for nonlinear and hybrid systems", in 2016. She was the 2019 winner of the Irène Joliot-Curie Prize as female scientist of the year.

== Bibliography ==
- Cyber-Physical-Human Systems: Fundamentals and Applications. Sarah K., Anuradha Annaswamy, Pramod P., Francoise Lamnabhi-Lagarrigue. 2022
