= Gene F. Franklin =

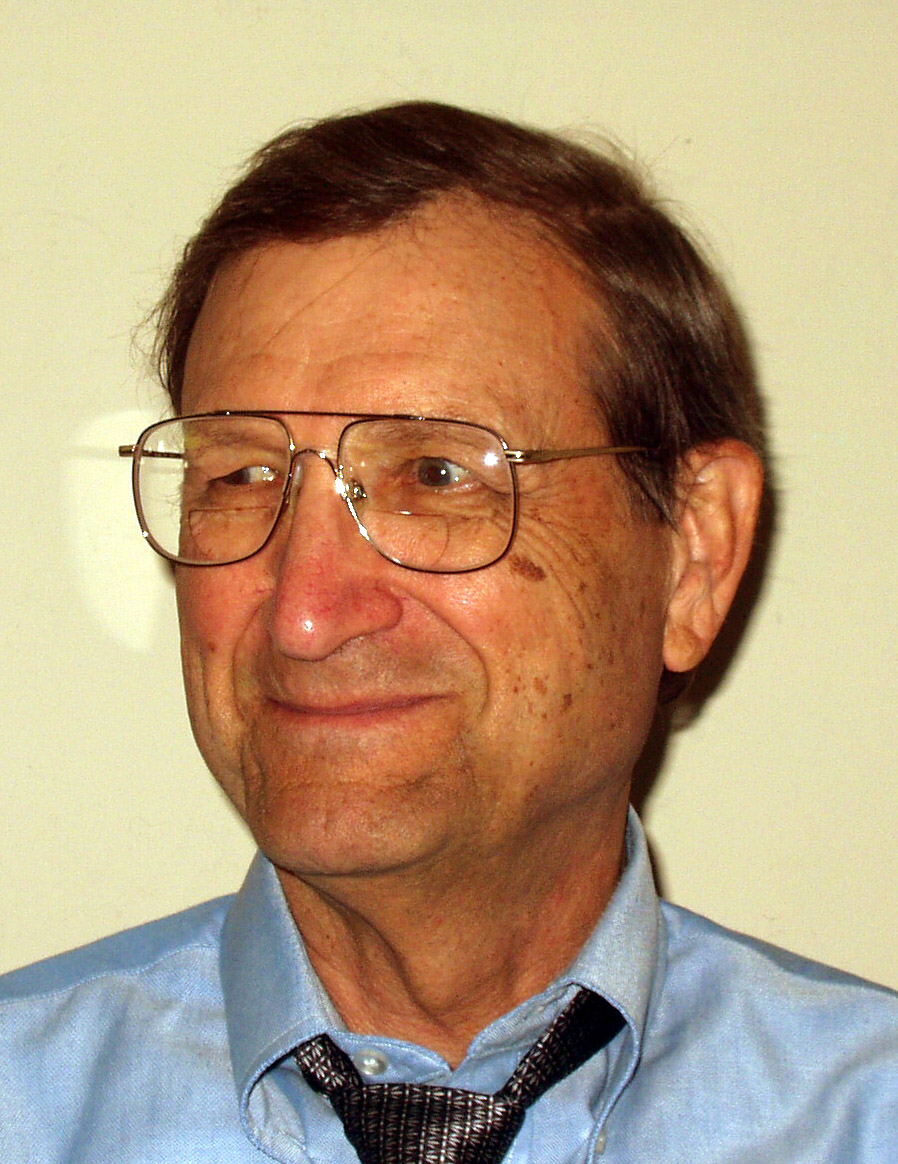
- Gene F. Franklin
- Born: July 25, 1927; Banner Elk, North Carolina
- Died: August 9, 2012 (aged 85); Palo Alto
- Citizenship: American
- Education: Georgia Institute of Technology; Massachusetts Institute of Technology; Columbia University
- Known for: Systems Control engineering and Automatic control theory U.S. space program (Apollo mission)
- Awards: John R. Ragazzini Award (1985), Richard E. Bellman Control Heritage Award (2005)
- Scientific career
- Fields: Electrical Engineering (Controls)
- Workplaces: Stanford University; NASA
- Doctoral advisor: John Ralph Ragazzini
- Doctoral students: Lucy Pao , Gilson Monteiro de Barros Fonseca

Gene F. Franklin (July 25, 1927 – August 9, 2012) was an American electrical engineer and control theorist known for his pioneering work towards the advancement of the control systems engineering – a subfield of electrical engineering. Most of his work on control theory was adapted immediately into NASA's U.S. space program, most famously in the control systems for the Apollo missions to the Moon in 1960s–1970s.

He is also noted for his authorship of influential texts on the control system, most notably, Feedback Control of Dynamic Systems, which has been translated into numerous of languages and has received literary prizes as the best book in the discipline of controls.

== Early life ==
Franklin was born in Banner Elk in North Carolina, United States, on July 25, 1927. His father was a professor of mathematics at the local college, and his mother was a nurse, an RN at the local hospital.

== Military career ==
Franklin joined the United States Navy in 1945, serving in World War II, and was assigned to Navy's radar systems. He lost his enthusiasm for the navy after President Truman's decision of atomic bombings of Japanese cities of Hiroshima and Nagasaki. He took a transfer to study electronics and taught a course on electronics at the Great Lakes Naval Training Center.

== Education ==
Franklin took a discharge from the navy on medical grounds and joined Georgia Institute of Technology.

He received his B.S. degree in electrical engineering from the Georgia Institute of Technology in 1950, his M.S. in electrical engineering from the Massachusetts Institute of Technology in 1952, and his D.E. Sc. degree from Columbia University in 1955. Franklin's 1958 doctoral thesis “Sampled-Data Control Systems” (co-authored by Franklin's dissertation advisor, John R. Ragazzini) introduced digital control to a discipline which had previously operated almost exclusively in the analog domain. This breakthrough allowed control systems to become much more precise and reliable.

== Teaching career ==
He taught at Columbia University from 1955 to 1957 before moving to Stanford University, where he was professor emeritus of electrical engineering until his death in August 2012. His research encompassed all aspects of control incorporating digital logic, including adaptive control of both nonlinear systems and systems with multiple-data sampling. He was a recipient of the Richard E. Bellman Control Heritage Award in 2005 for "fundamental contributions to the theory and practice of digital, modern, adaptive, and multivariable control" and the John R. Ragazzini Award in 1985 for "outstanding contributions and distinguished leadership in automatic control education".

== Death ==
On August 9, 2012, he died at Stanford Hospital in Palo Alto at the age of 85.
