= Arthur E. Bryson =

American aerospace and computer engineer

- Born: October 7, 1925 (age 100)
- Education: California Institute of Technology
- Awards: Rufus Oldenburger Medal (1980); Richard E. Bellman Control Heritage Award (1990); Daniel Guggenheim Medal (2009)
- Scientific career
- Fields: Control theory
- Thesis: An Interferometric Wind Tunnel Study of Transonic Flow past Wedge and Circular Arcs
- Doctoral advisor: Hans Wolfgang Liepmann
- Doctoral students: Stuart Dreyfus; Yu-Chi Ho; Jason Speyer

Arthur Earl Bryson Jr. (born October 7, 1925) is the Paul Pigott Professor of Engineering Emeritus at Stanford University and the "father of modern optimal control theory". With Henry J. Kelley, he also pioneered an early version of the backpropagation procedure, now widely used for machine learning and artificial neural networks.

He was a member of the U.S. Navy V-12 program at Iowa State College, and received his B.S. in aeronautical engineering there in 1946. He earned his Ph.D. from the California Institute of Technology, graduating in 1951. His thesis An Interferometric Wind Tunnel Study of Transonic Flow past Wedge and Circular Arcs was advised by Hans W. Liepmann.

Bryson was the Ph.D. advisor to the Harvard control theorist Yu-Chi Ho.

In 1970, Bryson was elected a member of the National Academy of Engineering for contributions to engineering education and imaginative application of modern statistical methods to engineering optimization.

== Awards and honors ==
He was awarded membership into the National Academy of Engineering in 1970 and the National Academy of Sciences in 1973. He was awarded the John R. Ragazzini Award in 1982 from the American Automatic Control Council, the IEEE Control Systems Science and Engineering Award in 1984, the Richard E. Bellman Control Heritage Award in 1990 from the American Automatic Control Council and the Daniel Guggenheim Medal in 2009.
