= Supervisory control theory =

Method for automatically synthesizing supervisors that restrict the behavior of a plant

The supervisory control theory (SCT), also known as the Ramadge–Wonham framework (RW framework), is a method for automatically synthesizing supervisors that restrict the behavior of a plant such that as much as possible of the given specifications are fulfilled. The plant is assumed to spontaneously generate events. The events are in either one of the following two categories controllable or uncontrollable. The supervisor observes the string of events generated by the plant and might prevent the plant from generating a subset of the controllable events. However, the supervisor has no means of forcing the plant to generate an event.

In its original formulation the SCT considered the plant and the specification to be modeled by formal languages, not necessarily regular languages generated by finite automata as was done in most subsequent work.

== See also ==
- Discrete event dynamic system (DEDS)
- Boolean differential calculus (BDC) – Subject field of Boolean algebra discussing changes of Boolean variables and functions
