= Anuradha Annaswamy =

American computer scientist

- Education: Yale University
- Known for: adaptive control theory
- Spouse: Mandayam Srinivasan
- Awards: IEEE Fellow (2002)
- Scientific career
- Fields: Computer science
- Institutions: Massachusetts Institute of Technology; Boston College; Yale University
- Website: meche.mit.edu/people/faculty/aanna@mit.edu

Anuradha M. Annaswamy is a computer scientist noted for her research on adaptive control theory and smart grids. Since 1996, she has worked at the Massachusetts Institute of Technology. Currently, Annaswamy is a senior research scientist at the Department of Mechanical Engineering at the Massachusetts Institute of Technology, and Director of the Active Adaptive Control Laboratory (a flight controls group).

== Career ==
Annaswamy received a B.E. degree from Indian Institute of Science in 1979. Following this, she completed a Ph.D in Computer science from Yale University in 1985.

In 2014, Annaswamy was awarded a grant, valued at £1,783,855, from the National Science Foundation to lead the project "Towards resilient computational models of electricity-gas ICI", in partnership with colleagues Christopher Knittel and Ignacio Perez-Arriaga.

Annaswamy has published over 500 academic publications, receiving over 18,000 citations. She has an h-index and i10-index of 56 and 210 respectively. Annaswamy's most cited publication (with over 5,000 citations), Stable adaptive systems, offers an understanding of the global stability properties essential to designing adaptive systems.

== Awards ==
- 2024 Control Systems Technology Award, IEEE Control Systems Society
- 2023 Best Paper Award, IFAC Journal of Annual Reviews in Control
- 2021 Distinguished Alumni, Indian Institute of Science
- 2017 Fellow, International Federation of Automatic Control
- 2017 Distinguished Lecturer, IEEE Control Systems Society
- 2016 IEEE Control Systems Society Distinguished Member
- 2010 Best Paper Award, IEEE Control Systems Magazine
- 2008 Donald Julius Groen Prize, Institute of Mechanical Engineers
- 2008 Hans Fischer Fellow, Technische Universitat Munchen-Institute for Advanced Studies
- 2002 IEEE Fellow for "contributions to adaptive control theory, neural networks and active-adaptive control of combustion systems."
- 1988 George Axelby best paper award, IEEE Trans. Autom. Control

== Personal life ==
Annaswamy is married to Mandayam Srinivasan.

== Bibliography ==
- Stable adaptive systems. Kumpati S Narendra, and Anuradha M Annaswamy. 2012. Courier Corporation.
- A new adaptive law for robust adaptation without persistent excitation. Kumpatis Narendra and Anuradham Annaswamy. 1987. IEEE Transactions on Automatic control. 32(2):134-145.
- Response of a laminar premixed flame to flow oscillations: A kinematic model and thermoacoustic instability results. M Fleifil, Anuradha M Annaswamy, ZA Ghoneim, Ahmed F Ghoniem. 1996. Combustion and flame. 106(4):487-510.
- Adaptive control of quadrotor UAVs: A design trade study with flight evaluations. Zachary T Dydek, Anuradha M Annaswamy, Eugene Lavretsky. 2012. IEEE Transactions on control systems technology. 21(4): 1400-1406.
- Cyber-Physical-Human Systems: Fundamentals and Applications. Sarah K., Anuradha Annaswamy, Pramod P., Francoise Lamnabhi-Lagarrigue. 2022
