= Kiyoshi Ohishi =

Kiyoshi Ohishi from the Nagaoka University of Technology, Japan was named Fellow of the Institute of Electrical and Electronics Engineers (IEEE) in 2015 for contributions to development of fast and robust motion control systems.
