= Calin Belta =

Control Engineer

Calin A. Belta
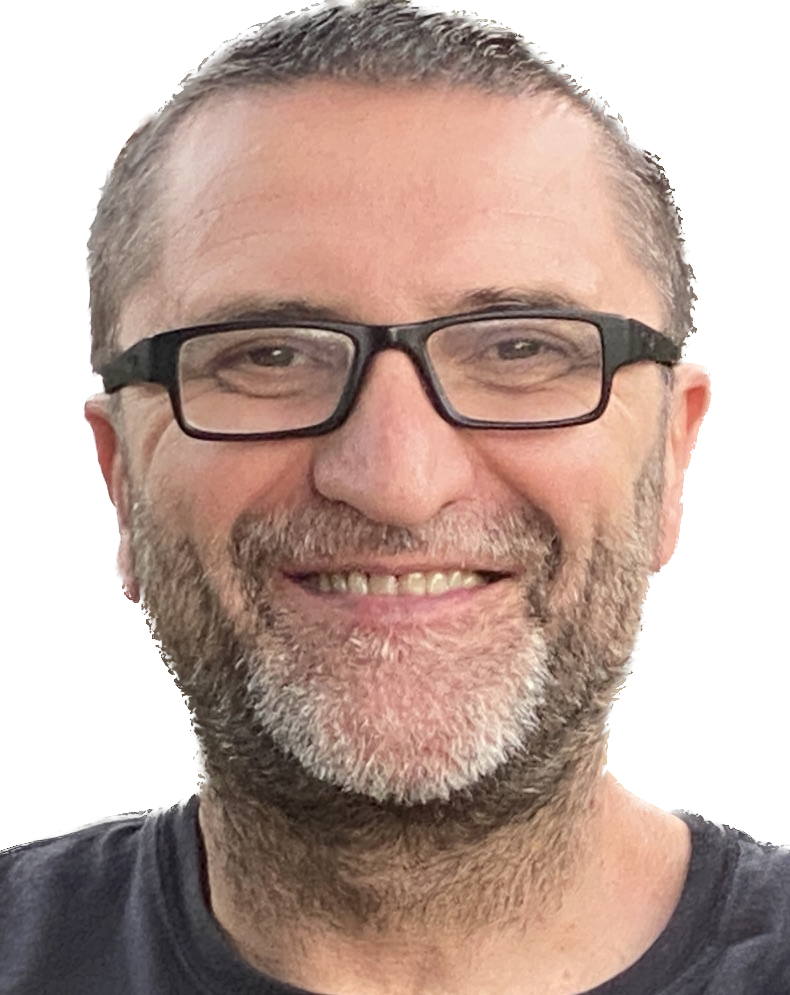
- Occupations: Control engineer, academic, and author

Academic background
- Education: B.S., Automatic Control and Computer Science; M.S., Automatic Control and Computer Science; M.S., Control Systems Engineering; M.S., Electrical Engineering; M.S., Mechanical Engineering; Ph.D., Mechanical Engineering
- Alma mater: Gheorghe Asachi Technical University; Louisiana State University; University of Pennsylvania

Călin A. Belta is a Romanian-American control engineer, academic, and author. He is the Brendan Iribe Endowed Professor of Electrical and Computer Engineering and Computer Science at the University of Maryland, College Park.

Belta's research brings together control theory, formal methods, and machine learning, with the goal of making control and machine learning systems safe and interpretable. The main application areas in his group are robotics and biology. Throughout his scholarly career, he has led research projects as Principal Investigator and contributed to journals, such as IEEE Transactions on Automatic Control, The International Journal of Robotics Research, and IEEE Transactions on Robotics. He has also authored book chapters and books, including Formal Methods for Discrete-Time Dynamical Systems.

Belta is an IEEE Fellow, was designated as a Distinguished Lecturer for the IEEE Control System Society (CSS), and has received the Air Force Office of Scientific Research (AFOSR) Young Investigator Award, the National Science Foundation (NSF) CAREER Award, and the IEEE Transactions on Control of Network Systems (TCNS) Outstanding Paper Award.

== Education and early career ==
Belta completed his B.S. and M.S. degrees in Automatic Control and Computer Science in July 1995, followed by an M.S. degree in Control in July 1996, from Gheorghe Asachi Technical University Iași, Romania. At the same institute, he served as an Assistant Professor from 1995 to 1997. Subsequently, he joined Louisiana State University as a Graduate Research Fellow at the Control Systems Laboratory, a role he held until 1999, where he also earned an M.S. in electrical engineering in May 1999. Additionally, he worked as a Graduate Research Fellow at the GRASP Laboratory, University of Pennsylvania, from 1999 to 2003, where he also obtained an M.S. and a Ph.D. in Mechanical Engineering in 2001 and 2003, respectively.

== Career ==
At Drexel University, Belta served as an Assistant Professor of Mechanical Engineering from 2003 to 2005. At Boston University, he undertook several positions. From 2005 to 2011, he was appointed Assistant Professor and later promoted to Associate Professor of Mechanical Engineering, Systems Engineering, Electrical and Computer Engineering, and Bioinformatics, roles he retained until 2015. He founded and directed the BU Robotics Lab and served as a Professor between 2015 and 2024. Subsequently, he held the Tegan Family Distinguished Professor position in Mechanical Engineering from 2016 until 2024. Along with these appointments, he also worked at Motional from 2019 to 2021. Since 2024, he has been the Brendan Iribe Endowed Professor of Electrical and Computer Engineering and Computer Science at the University of Maryland, College Park.

Belta serves as the Principal Investigator at the Belta Research Group. He also formerly directed the BU Robotics Lab. He holds the position of Series Editor for the Cyber-Physical Systems Series of MIT Press.

== Works ==
Belta's research has focused on control theory, formal methods, machine learning, robotics, and systems biology, particularly on stabilizing complex systems, optimizing their performance, and verifying them through temporal logic. In 2004, he co-developed an abstraction and control approach for robot groups, focusing on reducing complexity and enhancing scalability, while ensuring coordinated behavior with minimal communication and sensing requirements. Later, in 2005, with Isler and Pappas, he established a framework for generating correct control laws for planar robots in polygonal environments, bridging discrete planning algorithms with automatic feedback control law generation. Additionally, he explored symbolic planning and control for robot motion, aiming to integrate formal logic and automata theory. Following this, he engineered a fully automated framework to design feedback control laws for linear systems.

Belta co-authored the book Formal Methods for Discrete-Time Dynamical Systems, focusing on discrete-time linear and piecewise affine systems, and offering frameworks for model abstraction, analysis, and control. He also co-authored the book titled Safe Autonomy with Control Barrier Functions: Theory and Applications, where he introduced Control Barrier Functions (CBFs) to ensure safety in autonomous systems, providing both theoretical foundations and practical applications. In a collaborative research study with Xiao, he extended CBFs to high-order control barrier functions (HOCBFs) to address high relative degree constraints. In addition, he patented a method that successfully scored autonomous vehicle trajectories using crowd-sourced data, training a machine learning model to predict reasonableness scores for ranking and evaluating vehicle paths in traffic scenarios. He also patented a scenario-based behavior specification and validation method that evaluates driving scenarios for autonomous vehicles, ensuring rule compliance and measuring system performance.

== Media coverage ==
Belta's work has been featured in media, covering topics such as machine learning in robotics, stem cell research, and cancer-metabolism link. His contributions have also been highlighted in discussions on autonomous robots navigating complex urban environments, a framework for training robots in high-risk tasks, and the advancements of reinforcement learning for robotic systems.

== Awards and honors ==
- 2005 – CAREER Award, NSF
- 2008 – Young Investigator Award, AFOSR
- 2016 – Tegan Family Distinguished Faculty Fellow, Boston University
- 2017 – Fellow, IEEE
- 2017 – Outstanding Paper Award, IEEE TCNS
- 2019-2023 – Distinguished Lecturer, IEEE CSS
- 2024 – Keynote Speaker, IEEE International Conference on Robotics and Automation (ICRA)

== Bibliography ==
=== Books ===
- Formal Methods for Discrete-Time Dynamical Systems (2017) ISBN 9783319507644
- Safe Autonomy with Control Barrier Functions: Theory and Applications (2023) ISBN 9783031275760
- Adaptive and Learning-Based Control of Safety-Critical Systems (2023) ISBN 9783031293108

=== Selected articles ===
- Belta, C., & Kumar, V. (2004). Abstraction and control for groups of robots. IEEE Transactions on Robotics, 20(5), 865–875.
- Belta, C., Isler, V., & Pappas, G. J. (2005). Discrete abstractions for robot motion planning and control in polygonal environments. IEEE Transactions on Robotics, 21(5), 864–874.
- Belta, C., Bicchi, A., Egerstedt, M., Frazzoli, E., Klavins, E., & Pappas, G. J. (2007). Symbolic planning and control of robot motion [grand challenges of robotics]. IEEE Robotics & Automation Magazine, 14(1), 61–70.
- Kloetzer, M., & Belta, C. (2008). A fully automated framework for control of linear systems from temporal logic specifications. IEEE Transactions on Automatic Control, 53(1), 287–297.
- Xiao, W., & Belta, C. (2019, December). Control barrier functions for systems with high relative degree. In 2019 IEEE 58th Conference on Decision and Control (CDC) (pp. 474–479). IEEE.
