= Shankar Bhattacharyya =

American engineer

Sankar P. Bhattacharyya (June 23 1946 - July 3 2024), was an American engineer. He was a professor at the College of Engineering of the Texas A&M University (TAMU), and was active in the field of automatic control systems. Since December 2011, he has been a foreign member of Brazilian Academy of Sciences.

== Awards ==
- Fellow Award - International Federation of Automatic Control (IFAC), 2011.
