= Maria Pia Fanti =

Italian control theorist

Maria Pia Fanti (born 21 February 1957) is an Italian control theorist known for her research on topics that include discrete event dynamic systems, Petri nets, consensus, fault detection and isolation, agile manufacturing, and road traffic control. She is a professor in the Department of Electrical and Information Engineering at the Polytechnic University of Bari, where she heads the Laboratory for Control and Automation.

== Education and career ==
Fanti studied electronic engineering at the University of Pisa, and earned a laurea there in 1983. She has been a full professor at the Polytechnic University of Bari since 2012.

== Recognition ==
Fanti was named an IEEE Fellow in 2017 "for contributions to modeling and control of discrete event systems".
