= Kirsten Morris =

Canadian applied mathematician

Kirsten Anna Morris
- Born: 1960 (age 65–66)
- Education: Queen's University at Kingston, University of Waterloo
- Known for: Control of infinite-dimensional systems, smart materials, hysteresis
- Awards: IEEE Fellow (2020), SIAM Fellow (2021), IFAC Fellow, IEEE Distinguished Member Award
- Scientific career
- Fields: Applied mathematics, Control theory
- Workplaces: University of Waterloo
- Doctoral advisor: Mathukumalli Vidyasagar
- Website: Official profile

Kirsten Anna Morris (born 1960) is a Canadian applied mathematician specializing in control theory, including work on flexible structures, smart materials, hysteresis, and infinite-dimensional optimization. She is a professor at the University of Waterloo, the former chair of the Society for Industrial and Applied Mathematics Activity Group on Control and Systems, the author of two books on control theory, and an IEEE Fellow.

== Education and career ==
Morris was motivated to study mathematical economics at Queen's University at Kingston by a job doing econometrics at a bank, but lost interest in the economic applications of mathematics after a year, instead switching into a program in mathematics and engineering, which she finished in 1982. She became interested in control theory while studying for a master's degree at the University of Waterloo. After completing the degree in 1984, she continued at Waterloo as a doctoral student, and earned her Ph.D. there in 1989. Her dissertation, Finite-Dimensional Control of Infinite-Dimensional Systems, was supervised by Mathukumalli Vidyasagar.

After a year as a staff scientist at the NASA Langley Research Center, she returned to Waterloo as an assistant professor in the Department of Applied Mathematics in 1990. She became a full professor there in 2003, and also holds a cross-appointment in the Department of Mechanical and Mechatronics Engineering. She chaired the Society for Industrial and Applied Mathematics Activity Group on Control and Systems from 2018 to 2019, and has held leadership positions in the IEEE Control Systems Society and the International Federation of Automatic Control.

== Books ==
Morris is the author of the books Introduction to Feedback Control (Harcourt-Brace, 2001) and Controller Design for Distributed Parameter Systems (Springer, 2020). She is the editor of Control of Flexible Structures: Papers from the Workshop on Problems in Sensing, Identification and Control of Flexible Structures held in Waterloo, Ontario, June 1992 (American Mathematical Society, 1993).

== Recognition ==
In 2020, Morris was named an IEEE Fellow, affiliated with the IEEE Control Systems Society, "for contributions to control and estimator design for infinite-dimensional systems". She was named a SIAM Fellow in the 2021 class of fellows, "for contributions to modeling, approximation, and control design for distributed parameter systems". She is also a Fellow of the International Federation of Automatic Control.
