= Rama Yedavalli =

American engineer

- Born: 29 July 1951 (age 75); Rayagada, Orissa, India
- Citizenship: United States of America (USA)
- Education: Andhra University (1971) B.Sc; Indian Institute of Science (1974) B.E Electrical Engineering; Indian Institute of Science (1976) M.E Aerospace Engineering; Purdue University (1981) Ph.D School of Aeronautics and Astronautics
- Known for: Robust Control of Uncertain Dynamics Systems and Transformation Allergic Approach to Control systems Design
- Scientific career
- Fields: Control theory
- Doctoral advisor: Robert E. Skelton
- Website: www.robustengsys.com

Rama K. Yedavalli (born 29 July 1951 in Rayagada, Orissa, India) is an American engineering professor, currently at Ohio State University and an Elected Fellow of the American Association for the Advancement of Science, Institute of Electrical and Electronics Engineers and ASME.

== Education and career ==
Yedavalli was born on 29 July 1951 in Rayagada, Orissa, India. After graduating from St. Peter's high school in Visakhapatnam (also known popularly as Vizag), a coastal city in the then Andhra Pradesh stat of India, he entered the prestigious Mrs. A. V. N. College for his bachelor's degree in Science (B.Sc.) degree and graduated with a first class in 1971. Mrs. AVN college in Vizag has the distinction of being the alma mater of the Indian Nobel Laureate in Physics, Sir CV Raman.

He joined Indian Institute of Science in Bangalore for his Bachelor's in Electrical Technology and graduated with First Class in 1974 and continued at IISc for a Master's in Aerospace Engineering with a focus on control systems and earned his M.E. degree with Distinction in 1976.

Yedavalli began his Ph.D. studies in Aeronautics and Astronautics at Purdue University in Fall 1976 under Dr. Robert E. Skelton, completing his degree in 1981. His JPL-sponsored thesis on parameter sensitivity of flexible space structures led to multiple journal publications.

Right after graduation from Purdue, because of his passion for teaching and research, Yedavalli joined the Stevens Institute of Technology Hoboken, NJ for his first faculty job as an assistant professor in the Department of Mechanical Engineering in the fall of 1981. Then he joined the University of Toledo as an associate professor of Electrical Engineering department in the fall of 1985 and finally moved to the Ohio State University (OSU) in the fall of 1987 as an associate professor in the then department of Aeronautical and Astronautical Engineering.

From the fall of 1987 until his retirement at the end of December 31, 2021, he held various position as associate professor, Professor in the separate Aerospace engineering department until 2010 when that department merged with the Mechanical Engineering department to become the Mechanical and Aerospace Engineering (MAE) department. Then from 2010 to 2021 he held the position of Professor and the Director of the Distributed Engine Control and Simulation (DECS Lab) in the MAE department at OSU.

== Textbook Authorship ==
1. Authored a graduate level textbook titled Robust Control of Uncertain Dynamic Systems: A Linear State Space Approach, Book published by Springer in Jan 2014. ISBN 978-1-4614-9131-6, 978-1-4614-9132-3
2. Authored an Undergraduate level textbook on Flight Dynamics and Control of Aero and Space Vehicles for Wiley. The e-book (ISBN 978-1-118-93443-2) was published recently in Dec 2019 with the hard copy book (ISBN 978-1-118-93445-6) being available from Feb 2020.
