= Harry Kwatny =

American mechanical engineer

Harry Kwatny is an American mechanical engineer, the current S. Herbert Raynes Professor of Mechanical Engineering at Drexel University, and a published author.
