= Sonia Martínez Díaz =

Spanish mechanical engineer

Sonia Martínez Díaz is a Spanish mechanical engineer whose research applies control theory to the coordinated motion of robot swarms and mobile wireless sensor networks. She is a professor in the Department of Mechanical and Aerospace Engineering at the University of California, San Diego.

== Education and career ==
Martínez was the first in her family to study at a university, the University of the Basque Country. She has a licenciatura in mathematics from the University of Zaragoza, awarded in 1997, and she completed a Ph.D. in engineering mathematics at Charles III University of Madrid in 2002, working with Manuel de León Rodríguez of the Institute of Mathematical Sciences.

After working as a visiting assistant professor at the Polytechnic University of Catalonia, she came to the US on a Fulbright Fellowship for postdoctoral research with Francesco Bullo at the University of Illinois at Urbana–Champaign and University of California, Santa Barbara. She took her faculty position at the University of California, San Diego in 2005, and became a full professor there in 2014.

== Recognition ==
In 2018, Martínez was named an IEEE Fellow, affiliated with the IEEE Control Systems Society and IEEE Robotics and Automation Society, "for contributions to geometric mechanics and control". She was named as a SIAM Fellow, in the 2026 class of fellows, "for fundamental contributions to the theory of multi-agent and robotic systems with applications to distributed control, sensing, and estimation".

== Selected publications ==
=== Articles ===
- Martínez, Sonia; Cortés, Jorge (2002), "Design of oscillatory control systems", Proceedings of the 41st IEEE Conference on Decision and Control, vol. 2, pp. 1509–1514, doi:10.1109/cdc.2002.1184733, ISBN 0-7803-7516-5, S2CID 17157138. Winner of the CDC Best Student-Paper Award.
- Cortés, Jorge; Martínez, Sonia; Karataş, Timur; Bullo, Francesco (April 2004), "Coverage control for mobile sensing networks", IEEE Transactions on Robotics and Automation, 20 (2): 243–255, arXiv:math/0212212, Bibcode:2004ITRA...20..243C, doi:10.1109/tra.2004.824698, S2CID 2022860
- Cortés, Jorge; Martínez, Sonia; Bullo, Francesco (August 2006), "Robust rendezvous for mobile autonomous agents via proximity graphs in arbitrary dimensions", IEEE Transactions on Automatic Control, 51 (8): 1289–1298, Bibcode:2006ITAC...51.1289C, doi:10.1109/tac.2006.878713, S2CID 15117155. Listed as a "classic paper" by Google Scholar.
- Martínez, Sonia; Cortés, Jorge; Bullo, Francesco (August 2007), "Motion coordination with distributed information", IEEE Control Systems Magazine, vol. 27, no. 4, pp. 75–88, doi:10.1109/mcs.2007.384124, S2CID 14017918. Winner of the 2008 IEEE Control Systems Magazine Outstanding Paper Award.
- Zhu, Minghui; Martínez, Sonia (January 2012), "On distributed convex optimization under inequality and equality constraints", IEEE Transactions on Automatic Control, 57 (1): 151–164, arXiv:1001.2612, Bibcode:2012ITAC...57..151Z, doi:10.1109/tac.2011.2167817, S2CID 11818107

=== Books ===
- Bullo, Francesco; Cortés, Jorge; Martínez, Sonia (2009), Distributed Control of Robotic Networks: A Mathematical Approach to Motion Coordination Algorithms, Princeton University Press, ISBN 9781400831470
- Zhu, Minghui; Martínez, Sonia (2015), Distributed Optimization-Based Control of Multi-Agent Networks in Complex Environments, Springer Briefs in Electrical and Computer Engineering: Control, Automation, and Robotics, Springer, doi:10.1007/978-3-319-19072-3, ISBN 9783319190716, ISSN 2192-6786
