= Jane Cullum =

American applied mathematician

Jane Grace Kehoe Cullum (born 1938) is an American applied mathematician known for her work in numerical algorithms and control theory, who became president of the IEEE Control Systems Society.

== Education and career ==
Cullum studied chemical engineering at Virginia Tech, graduating in 1960. She continued at Virginia Tech for a master's degree in mathematics in 1962, with the master's thesis Applications of the analog computer to mathematical problems. She completed a Ph.D. in applied mathematics at the University of California, Berkeley, in 1966. Her dissertation, Continuous Optimal Control Problems with Phase Space Constraints, concerned control theory, and was supervised by Stephen Diliberto.

She worked for IBM Research at the Thomas J. Watson Research Center from 1967 until 1998, when she moved to the Los Alamos National Laboratory.

She served as president of the IEEE Control Systems Society in 1989.

== Books ==
With Ralph A. Willoughby, Cullum is the coauthor of the books Lanczos Algorithms for Large Symmetric Eigenvalue Computations: Vol. I, Theory and Lanczos Algorithms for Large Symmetric Eigenvalue Computations: Vol. II, Programs (Birkhäuser, 1985). The first volume was reprinted by the Society for Industrial and Applied Mathematics in 2002, as volume 41 of their Classics in Applied Mathematics book series.

== Recognition ==
The IEEE Control Systems Society gave Cullum their Distinguished Member Award in 1989. She was elected as an IEEE Fellow in 1990, "for contributions to practical numerical algorithms for large-scale systems".
