= Karen Rudie =

Canadian control theorist and electrical engineer

Karen Gail Rudie (born 1963) is a Canadian control theorist and electrical engineer known for her work on the decentralized control of discrete event dynamic systems. She is a professor of electrical and computer engineering in Queen's University at Kingston.

== Education and career ==
Rudie majored in mathematics and engineering as an undergraduate at Queen's University, specializing in control and communication; she graduated in 1985. She has a Ph.D. from the University of Toronto, completed in 1992; Her dissertation, Decentralized Control of Discrete-Event Systems, was supervised by Walter Murray Wonham.

She returned to Queen's University as a faculty member in 1993, after postdoctoral research at the Institute for Mathematics and its Applications.

== Recognition ==
In 2018, Rudie was named an IEEE Fellow, as a member of the IEEE Control Systems Society, "for contributions to the supervisory control theory of discrete event systems".
