= Gerard Gaynor =

American electrical engineer (1921–2026)

- Born: Gerard Henry Gaynor; November 20, 1921; Toledo, Ohio, U.S.
- Died: March 9, 2026 (aged 104); Minneapolis, Minnesota, U.S.
- Education: University of Michigan
- Occupation: Electrical engineer
- Spouse: Shirley Margaret Karrels (m. 1953; died. 2018)

Gerard Henry Gaynor (November 20, 1921 – March 9, 2026) was an American electrical engineer.

== Early life and career ==
Gerard Henry Gaynor was born in Toledo, Ohio, on November 20, 1921. He served in the United States Army Signal Corps during World War II. After his discharge, he attended the University of Michigan, earning his degree in electrical engineering.

From 1972, Gaynor worked at 3M, and rose up to the positions of chief engineer and director of engineering until his retirement in 1987. In 1999, he was named a fellow of the Institute of Electrical and Electronics Engineers, "for contributions to engineering and technology management".

== Personal life and death ==
In 1953, Gaynor married Shirley Margaret Karrels. Their marriage lasted until her death in 2018.

On November 20, 2021, Gaynor turned 100. He died at his home in Minneapolis, Minnesota, on March 9, 2026, at the age of 104.
