= Kristin Ytterstad Pettersen =

Norwegian professor

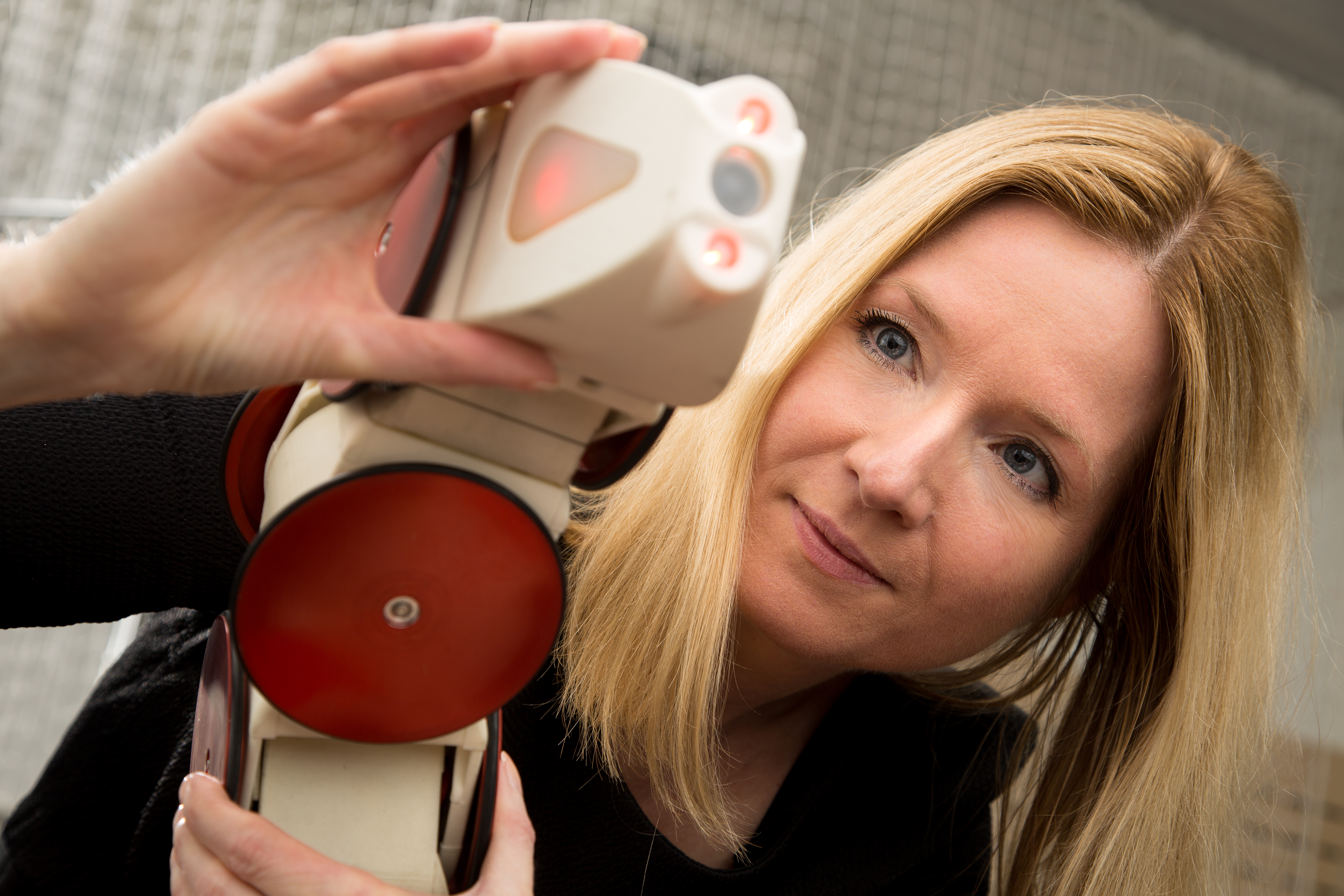
Pettersen with one of her snakebots

Kristin Ytterstad Pettersen (born 28 January 1969) is a Norwegian control systems researcher known for her contributions to nonlinear control and robotics, particularly snake robots and marine robotics. She is a Professor in the Department of Engineering Cybernetics at the Norwegian University of Science and Technology (NTNU), where she has been a faculty member since 1996. She is internationally recognized for her contributions to nonlinear control and robotics, particularly in the fields of marine robotics, snake robots, and autonomous vehicles.

== Education and Academic Career ==
Pettersen received the MSc degree in Engineering Cybernetics from the Norwegian Institute of Technology (NTH) in 1992, and the PhD (dr.ing.) in Engineering Cybernetics from NTNU in 1996. Her doctoral thesis was titled Exponential Stabilization of Underactuated Vehicles. She became a full professor in May 2002, becoming the first woman to hold this rank at the Faculty of Electrical Engineering at NTNU.

She served as Head of the Department of Engineering Cybernetics from 2011 to 2013 and Vice Head from 2009 to 2011. From 2010 to 2013, she was also Director of the NTNU ICT Program of Robotics. She has been an Adjunct Professor at the Norwegian Defence Research Establishment (FFI) since 2014.

From 2013 to 2023, she was a Key Scientist at the Centre of Excellence for Autonomous Marine Operations and Systems (NTNU AMOS). Since 2020, she has been a Key Scientist at the VISTA Centre for Autonomous Robotic Operations Subsea. Pettersen has published four books and over 350 papers in international journals and conference proceedings.

== Research and Innovation ==
Pettersen’s research focuses on nonlinear control theory with applications to mechanical systems, especially autonomous marine vehicles, snake robots, and other underactuated robotic systems. She was awarded the IEEE Transactions on Control Systems Technology Outstanding Paper Award in both 2006 and 2017.

She is one of the co-founders of the subsea robotics company Eelume, where she served as CEO from 2015 to 2016 and currently serves on the board.

In 2021, she was awarded an ERC Advanced Grant for her project CRÈME - Control of Light Vehicle-Manipulator Systems.

== Honours and Professional Service ==
In 2017, Pettersen became the first Norwegian woman to be elevated to IEEE Fellow, and in 2020, she became the first Norwegian recipient of the Hendrik W. Bode Lecture Prize. She served on the Board of Governors of the IEEE Control Systems Society (CSS) from 2012 to 2014 and again from 2022 to 2024, and was the IEEE CSS Vice President for Membership from 2023 to 2024. From 2019 to 2022, she was an IEEE CSS Distinguished Lecturer.

She served as a council member of the International Federation of Automatic Control (IFAC) from 2017 to 2023, and of the European Control Association (EUCA) from 2019 to 2023.

Pettersen has held editorial roles including Associate Editor and Senior Editor of IEEE Transactions on Control Systems Technology, Associate Editor of IEEE Control Systems Magazine, and Co-Editor-in-Chief of Robotics for IFAC Mechatronics.

Pettersen has been a member of the Norwegian Academy of Technological Sciences since 2013, the Royal Norwegian Society of Sciences and Letters since 2018, and the Norwegian Academy of Science and Letters since 2025.
