= Lucy Pao =

American electrical engineer and control theorist

Lucy Ya Pao is an American electrical engineer and control theorist known for her work on controlling and maximizing the energy capture of wind turbines and more generally on the control of flexible structures. She is Richard and Joy Dorf Professor of Electrical, Computer, and Energy Engineering and a Fellow of the Renewable and Sustainable Energy Institute at the University of Colorado Boulder.

== Education and career ==
Pao earned bachelor's, master's, and Ph.D. degrees in electrical engineering at Stanford University in 1987, 1988, and 1992 respectively. Her doctoral advisor was Gene F. Franklin. After working for two years at the Mitre Corporation, she became an assistant professor at Northwestern University in 1993, and moved to the University of Colorado in 1995.

== Recognition ==
Pao was given the Richard and Joy Dorf Professorship in 2009. She was named an IEEE Fellow in 2012 "for contributions to feedforward and feedback control systems", and named a fellow of the International Federation of Automatic Control in 2014. In 2017 the American Automatic Control Council gave her their Control Engineering Practice Award "for pioneering applications of advanced control to wind turbines and wind farms".

== Personal life ==
Pao is married to Russian-American condensed matter physicist Leo Radzihovsky; they have two children.
