= Jan Maciejowski =

British electrical engineer

- Education: University of Cambridge; University of Sussex
- Known for: Contributions to system identification and control
- Awards: FIEEE
- Scientific career
- Fields: control engineering
- Workplaces: University of Cambridge
- Website: www-control.eng.cam.ac.uk/Main/JanMaciejowski

Jan M. Maciejowski is a British electrical engineer. He is professor emeritus of control engineering at the University of Cambridge. He is notable for his contributions to system identification and control.

== Career ==
Maciejowski retired in November 2018.

== Awards ==
- Fellowship of the IEEE, awarded in 2011. Gained a Stand in 2016

== See also ==
- Control reconfiguration
- Autonomous robot
- Model predictive control
- System identification
