= Chen Hong (painter) =

8th-century Chinese imperial court painter

Chen Hong (simplified Chinese: 陈闳; traditional Chinese: 陳閎; pinyin: Chén Hóng; Wade–Giles: Ch'en Hung); is an 8th-century Chinese imperial court painter who lived during the Tang dynasty. His birth and death years are unknown.

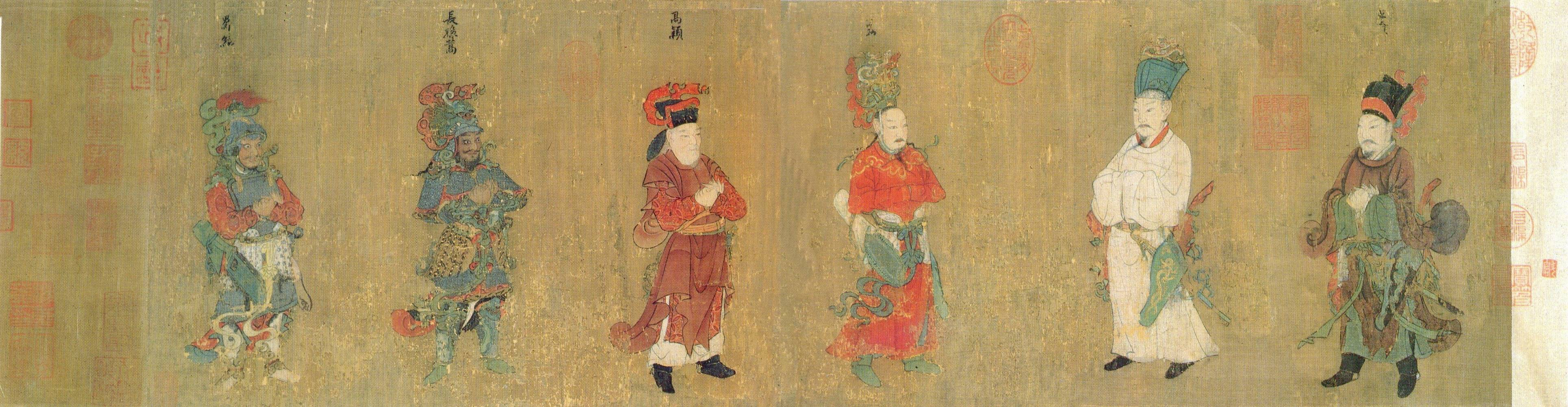
Eight Noble Officials, by Chen Hong
