= Ioannis Dimitriou =

Greek cotton and industrial merchant

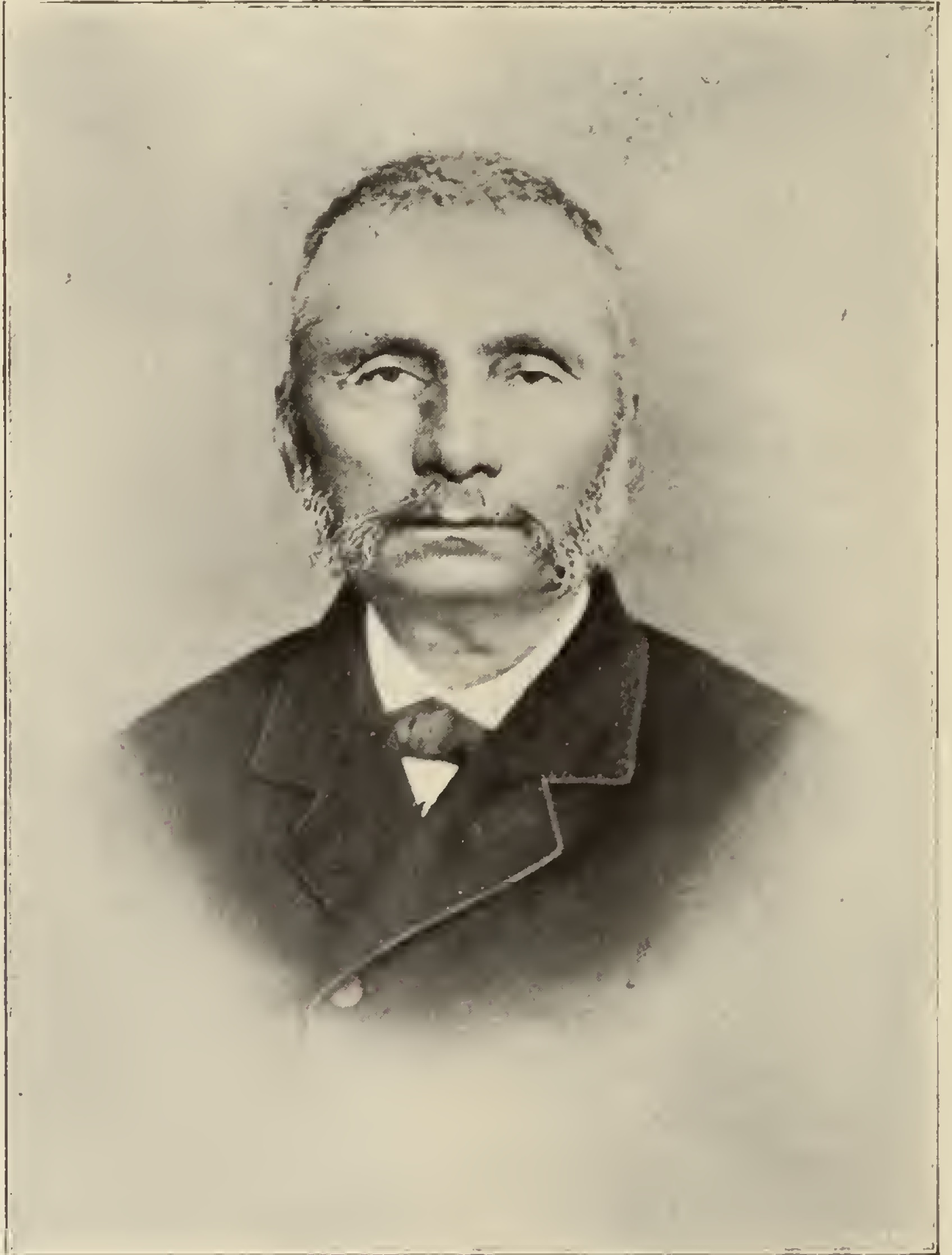

Ioannis Dimitriou (Greek: Ιωάννης Δημητρίου, 1826–c. 1900) was a cotton and industrial merchant who worked in Egypt and was a major donator of ancient Egyptian artifacts which he gave to the National Archaeological Museum in Athens. He also worked in his home island of Lemnos.

== Biography ==
He was born in 1826 in the village of Pesperago on the island of Lemnos. From his early age, he worked in Alexandria, Egypt where many Lemnians lived at that time. He took part in cotton manufacturing, the industrial workforce in a cotton company. He cooperated with the British and amassed a great fortune.

He was one of the eminent Lemnians in Egypt and along with the banker John Antoniadis and the worker Kyriakos Christodoulos, he represented the Egyptian-Lemnian businessmen who actively came from the island. They took part in the councils that were necessary for the functioning of the schools of the Greek community. He was one of the first members of the Lemnian Brotherhood in Alexandria.

He died in Alexandria in the first decade of the 20th century.

== Antiquities collection ==
Dimitriou was also an amateur archaeologist and a collector of artifacts mostly on Ancient Egypt as well as of ancient coinage. He was among those who worked and spent money for the running of the Alexandria Greek Museum in 1895.

He donated his collection of ancient artifacts to the National Archaeological Museum in Athens in 1890. His collection was the basis for the Egyptian collection of the museum.

Between 1892 and 1898, he gave a collection of 10,000 Ptolemaic coins to the Numismatic Museum of Athens with the mediation of the Greek consul Markos Dragoumis. For the preservation of coins, he created two rich oaken coin libraries which are preserved in the museum.

== Bibliography ==
- Chrysikopoulos V., «L’Histoire des Collections d’Antiquites Egyptiennes du Musee National d’Athenes» (History of Ancient Egyptian Collections at the National Museum of Athens), 2001, Lyon, France, p 36 και 358-374: «Les Principaux Donateurs de la Collection d’Athenes: Alexandros Rostovitz et Ioannis Dimitriou». (The Main Donators of the Athens Collestion: Alexandros Rostovitz and Ioannis Dimitriou)
