= Concurrent estimation =

In discrete event simulation concurrent estimation is a technique used to estimate the effect of alternate parameter settings on a discrete event system. For example, from observation of a (computer simulated) telecommunications system with a specified buffer size $B_0$, one estimates what the performance would be if the buffer size had been set to the alternate values $B_1,\ldots,B_n$. Effectively the technique generates (during a single simulation run) $n$ alternative histories for the system state variables, which have the same probability of occurring as the main simulated state path; this results in a computational saving as compared to running $n$ additional simulations, one for each alternative parameter value.

The technique was developed by Cassandras, Strickland and Panayiotou.
