= Håkan Hjalmarsson =

KTH graduate

Håkan Hjalmarsson from the Royal Institute of Technology (KTH), Sweden, Stockholm, Sweden was named Fellow of the Institute of Electrical and Electronics Engineers (IEEE) in 2013 for contributions to data-based controller design.
