= María Inés Valla =

Argentine engineer

María Inés Valla (born 1956) is an Argentine electronic and power engineer specializing in power electronics and nonlinear control for electric power systems. She is a professor of electrical engineering at the National University of La Plata, affiliated with the National Scientific and Technical Research Council (CONICET) Institute for Research in Electronics, Control and Signal Processing (LEICI).

== Education and career ==
Valla was born in Paraná, Entre Ríos on April 3, 1956. She earned an engineering degree from the National University of La Plata in 1980 and completed a doctorate there in 1994, under the joint supervision of Carlos F. Christiansen and José María Catalfo.

She served as co-editor-in-chief of IEEE Transactions on Industrial Electronics from 2013 to 2018.

== Book ==
Valla is the coauthor, with Sergio Alberto González and Santiago Andrés Verne, of the book Multilevel Converters for Industrial Applications (CRC Press, 2014).

== Recognition ==
Valla received the IEEE Third Millennium Medal in 2000. She was named an IEEE Fellow in 2010 "for contributions to non-linear control of electric drives". In 2019, the National Academy of Exact, Physical and Natural Sciences of Argentina gave Valla the Premio Consagración, their highest award.
