= Kyriacos Demetriou =

New York City Barber

- Born: April 14, 1916; Cyprus
- Died: May 14, 1999 (aged 80); New York City, New York, United States
- Other name: Mr. Kay
- Occupation: Barber
- Years active: 1930 - 1996
- Employer: Self-employed
- Known for: Traditional barber services

Kyriacos Demetriou (Greek: Δημητρίου Κυριάκος, known as Mr. Kay) (April 14, 1919 – May 14, 1999) was a New York City barber known for his adherence to traditional practices within his craft.

Mr. Kay was born in Cyprus, but his family moved to England when he was an infant. His family struggled financially, and he took up work as a shoeshine boy outside a barbershop on London's West End. He became an apprentice to the proprietor, at first standing on a milk crate to cut. He won a national barber competition, and in the late 1930s he emigrated to New York. He worked at various places before taking over the Broadway Barbershop.

His business was on the west side of Broadway in Manhattan's Upper West Side between 103rd and 104th Streets. Reputed to be the oldest in the city, it was founded in 1904. Mr. Kay took over in the early 1970s and ran it for almost 30 years until he retired in 1996. In addition to haircuts, he provided shaves with a straight razor. He maintained his salon in keeping with traditional barber shops, and when he retired he refused offers to sell the interior and donated it instead to the Museum of the City of New York.

Throughout the years, as his business increasingly became an anachronism, it was featured in articles, books, and art. He was featured at least twice in New Yorker cartoons, as a subject in a painting by Max Ferguson, and in books about fading New York businesses. Mr. Kay claimed to have given Yul Brynner his first shaved head, and to have cut the hair of presidents Harry Truman and Dwight D. Eisenhower, as well as that of actor Humphrey Bogart, the composers Aaron Copland and George Gershwin. He had an appearance on Sesame Street. He took a particular interest in the families he served. He worked six days a week, did not post his prices, refused to take appointments, and made customers wait, often standing in line outside his shop.

A mainstay on the Upper West Side through the years, he was also known for his daily exchange with a passerby who would knock on his door on his way home from work:

"Hello."

"Hello, Mr. Wilson. How are you today?"

"Miserable. Miserable."
