= Marco Claudio Campi =

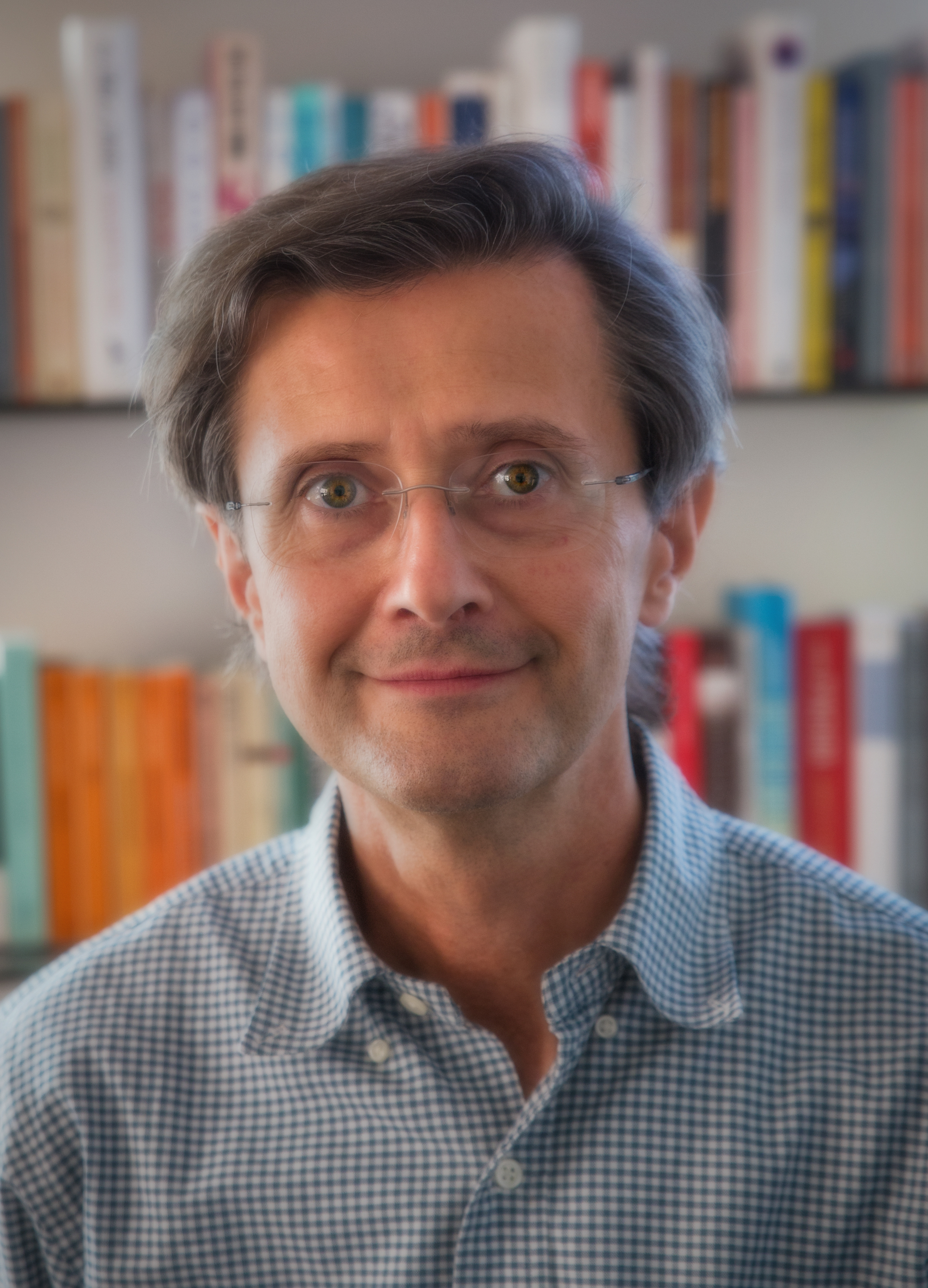
- Born: Tradate, Italy
- Education: Politecnico di Milano
- Known for: Scenario optimization, Virtual Reference Feedback Tuning
- Awards: George S. Axelby Award, IEEE Fellow, IFAC Fellow
- Scientific career
- Fields: Inductive reasoning, Statistical learning theory, Data science, Control engineering
- Workplaces: University of Brescia
- Doctoral students: Maria Prandini
- Website: marco-campi.unibs.it

Marco Claudio Campi is a mathematician with an engineering background and an interest in the philosophy of science, who specializes in data science and inductive methods. He holds a permanent appointment with the University of Brescia, Italy, while also collaborating with various research institutions, universities and NASA. Since 2012, he has been a Fellow of the Institute of Electrical and Electronics Engineers (IEEE) and since 2020 a Fellow of the International Federation of Automatic Control.

== Academic research ==
Campi is a co-creator of the scenario approach, which provides a solid mathematical foundation to observation-driven decision-making based on consistent rules. His early contributions in this area demonstrated that, within a convex optimization framework, bounds to the probability of invalidating a decision can be directly determined form the dimensionality of the optimization domain. Subsequent advancements extended this result to schemes permitting the exclusion of certain observations to enhance decision-related costs. More recent work has revealed a deep-seated connection between the concept of complexity of a decision (precisely defined in his papers) and its reliability. The scenario approach has found practical applications across various domains, including control theory, portfolio optimization and statistical classification.

Campi is also the inventor of the Virtual Reference Feedback Tuning (VRFT), an approach to design controllers using batches of data collected from a plant.

== Inductive reasoning ==
Campi's conceptualisation of inductive reasoning adopts a minimalist stance, comprising solely two components: experience and judgements. Experience drives the evolution of judgements in a continuous flow, where observed facts are used to update opinions and opinions are employed to anticipate facts that have yet to happen. Judgements encapsulate an individual's knowledge, while also playing an essential role in those deliberations that are intended to guide decisions.

Judgements are not certain, and Campi's deeply mathematised approach to the study of induction makes prominent use of probability as a tool to quantify one's degree of belief in judgements. While he does not exclude that alternative interpretations of probability can be useful in other contexts, he contends that, within his theoretical framework, the only possible interpretation is subjective probability. As a result, assuming independent and identically distributed (i.i.d.) or, more generally, exchangeable observations in no way posits a state of nature, it merely presents a modelling assumption regarding how an individual expects the flow of observations to unfold. This conceptualisation overcomes Hume’s critique of the impossibility of demonstrating that reality satisfies a “uniformity principle”.

By the only use of deductive logic, Campi develops a complexity-based framework that justifies the use of observations in constructing models and principles. In his approach, complexity assumes the role of a measurable quantity from which the probability of falsification of an inductive conclusion can be accurately estimated. These findings hold in an i.i.d. framework without requiring any a priori assumption on the probabilistic distribution of the observations (agnostic setup) and delve deeply into exploring the mechanisms through which knowledge can be generated in light of observations. As a corollary, Campi asserts that adapting theories to observations is scientifically valid provided that this adaptation is guided by an impartial judge - the complexity. This stands in stark contrast with Popper’s perspective that denounces the practice of adjusting theories to observations.

While Campi’s results rigorously justify the use of inductive procedures, he also emphasises a fundamental distinction between the reliability of a procedure and the reliability of the outcome of a procedure in response to a given set of observations (conditional evaluations). He contends that making rigorous statements about the latter is impossible without using additional a priori information. This is what he terms the “unassailable relativism” of conditional beliefs.

== Awards and honours ==
- Institute of Electrical and Electronics Engineers Fellow, 2012, for contributions to stochastic and randomized methods in systems and control
- International Federation of Automatic Control Fellow, 2020, for contributions to data-driven methods in systems and control
- George S. Axelby Award, 2008.
- Roberto Tempo Award, 2025.
