= Jason Speyer =

American mechanical and aerospace engineer

Jason Lee Speyer is an American engineer working with mechanical and aerospace engineering currently the Ronald and Valerie Sugar Endowed Professor of Engineering, at University of California, Los Angeles and is also a published author, being held in 860 libraries.

== Education and career ==
He received both his Bachelor and Master of Science at Massachusetts Institute of Technology and his Ph.D at Harvard University under the supervision of Arthur E. Bryson in 1968. Other professor positions he has held include the Harry H. Power Professorship in Engineering at the University of Texas at Austin from 1982 to 1990, the Lady Davis Professor, Department of Aeronautics at the Technion – Israel Institute of Technology in 1983 and then also the Jerome C. Hunsaker Visiting Professor of Aeronautics and Astronautics at MIT from 1989 to 1990. In 1985, while at UT, he was given the Billy and Claude R. Hocott Distinguished Engineering Research Award. Speyer is a member of the American Institute of Aeronautics and Astronautics and Institute of Electrical and Electronics Engineers. Before becoming a professor, he worked as an engineer for Boeing and Raytheon and also as a researcher at Charles Stark Draper Laboratory. In 2005, he was elected a member of the National Academy of Engineering for the development and application of advanced techniques for optimal navigation and control of a wide range of aerospace vehicles.
