= Yutaka Yamamoto (mathematician) =

Japanese mathematician

Yutaka Yamamoto (山本 裕, Yamamoto Yutaka, born 29 March 1950), is a Japanese mathematician working in systems theory, control theory, and signal processing.
