= Le Yi Wang =

Professor of electrical engineering

Le Yi Wang (王乐一) is a professor of electrical engineering at Wayne State University in Detroit, Michigan.

Wang received his master's degree from the Department of Computer Science and Automation, Shanghai Institute of Mechanical Engineering (now part of the University of Shanghai for Science and Technology) in 1982, and then his Ph.D. from the Department of Electrical Engineering, McGill University in 1990. He was named Fellow of the Institute of Electrical and Electronics Engineers (IEEE) in 2012 "for contributions to system identification and the analysis of system complexity".
