= Leyuan Shi =

Chinese-American industrial engineer

Leyuan Shi is a Chinese-American industrial engineer and a professor in the Department of Industrial and Systems Engineering of the University of Wisconsin–Madison. Her research focuses on the modeling, simulation, and optimization of large-scale systems for smart manufacturing, supply chains, and communications.

== Education and career ==
Shi studied mathematics at Nanjing Normal University, graduating in 1982. After a second master's degree in applied mathematics in 1985 from Tsinghua University, she went to Harvard University for continued study in applied mathematics. She earned a second master's degree there in 1990, and completed her Ph.D. in 1992. Her doctoral dissertation, Optimization of Discrete Event Dynamic Systems, was supervised by Yu-Chi Ho.

After joining the University of Wisconsin, Shi founded a spinoff company in 1995 named LS Optimal. In 2010 she took a leave from Wisconsin to join the Department of Industrial Engineering and Management at Peking University. In 2020 she was named as director of Wisconsin's Center for Quick Response Manufacturing.

== Books ==
Shi's books include:

- Modeling, Control and Optimization of Complex Systems (edited with Weibo Gong, Springer, 2003)
- Nested Partitions Method, Theory and Applications (with Sigurdur Ólafsson, Springer, 2009)
- Supply Chain Management and Logistics: Innovative Strategies and Practical Solutions (edited with Zhe Liang and W. Art Chaovalitwongse, CRC Press, 2016)

== Recognition ==
Shi was elected as an IEEE Fellow in 2011.
