= Bijnan Bandyopadhyay =

Indian professor

- Occupation: Professor

Academic background
- Education: Ph.D

Bijnan Bandyopadhyay is an Indian Professor who worked at the Department of Systems and Control Engineering at Indian Institute of Technology Bombay from 1987 to 2022. He also serves as a Visiting Professor in the Department of Electrical Engineering at the Indian Institute of Technology Jodhpur.

== Education ==
Bandyopadhyay completed his Bachelor of Engineering degree in electronics and telecommunication engineering from the University of Calcutta in 1978. He then pursued his PhD in electrical engineering from Indian Institute of Technology Delhi in 1986. He is a Life Fellow of IEEE. He is also a Fellow of the Indian National Academy of Engineering, Fellow of the National Academy of Sciences of India, Indian National Academy of Science. Elected as a Fellow of the Indian Academy of Sciences in 2020.

== Research ==
His research areas of interest are Automation and Control Systems, Instruments & Instrumentation, Nuclear Science & Technology, Computer Science. He has total of 138 journal articles, 29 books, 178 Conference Proceedings, 9238 Google scholar citations and 351 publications, including:

- Sahu, P.; Fulwani, D.M.; Bandyopadhyay, B. (2023). "Event-triggered mechanism with parameterized adaptive feedback controller for network resource-aware system". European Journal of Control. 71. doi:10.1016/j.ejcon.2023.100802.
- Behera, Abhisek K.; Bandyopadhyay, Bijnan; Yu, Xinghuo (October 2018). "Periodic event-triggered sliding mode control". Automatica. 96: 61–72. doi:10.1016/j.automatica.2018.06.035.
- Kamal, Shyam; Moreno, Jaime A.; Chalanga, Asif; Bandyopadhyay, Bijnan; Fridman, Leonid M. (July 2016). "Continuous terminal sliding-mode controller". Automatica. 69: 308–314. doi:10.1016/j.automatica.2016.02.001.
- Chalanga, Asif; Kamal, Shyam; Fridman, Leonid M.; Bandyopadhyay, Bijnan; Moreno, Jaime A. (June 2016). "Implementation of Super-Twisting Control: Super-Twisting and Higher Order Sliding-Mode Observer-Based Approaches". IEEE Transactions on Industrial Electronics. 63 (6): 3677–3685. doi:10.1109/TIE.2016.2523913.
- Stabilization and Control of Fractional Order Systems: A Sliding Mode Approach. Lecture Notes in Electrical Engineering. Vol. 317. 2015. doi:10.1007/978-3-319-08621-7. ISBN 978-3-319-08620-0.
- Kamal, Shyam; Raman, Arun; Bandyopadhyay, Bijnan (June 2013). "Finite-Time Stabilization of Fractional Order Uncertain Chain of Integrator: An Integral Sliding Mode Approach". IEEE Transactions on Automatic Control. 58 (6): 1597–1602. doi:10.1109/TAC.2012.2228051.
- Bandyopadhyay, B.; Janardhanan, S.; Spurgeon, S.K., eds. (2013). Advances in Sliding Mode Control: Concept, Theory and Implementation. Springer Berlin Heidelberg. ISBN 978-3-642-36985-8.
