= Somayeh Sojoudi =

Iranian-American electrical engineer

Somayeh Sojoudi is an Iranian and American electrical engineer who works at the University of California, Berkeley as an associate professor in the Department of Electrical Engineering and Computer Science and the Department of Mechanical Engineering. Her research is interdisciplinary, combining convex optimization, control theory, network science, and machine learning to complex problems in systems engineering, the analysis of power grids, and neuroscience.

== Education and career ==
Sojoudi was an undergraduate student of electrical engineering at Shahed University in Tehran, and has a master's degree in electrical and computer engineering from Concordia University in Montreal. She completed her Ph.D. in 2013 at the California Institute of Technology, with the dissertation Mathematical Study of Complex Networks: Brain, Internet, and Power Grid supervised by John Doyle.

She was a postdoctoral researcher at NYU Langone Health, working there on the application of graphical models to epilepsy, before taking a faculty position at UC Berkeley.

== Recognition ==
Sojoudi was a 2015 recipient of the INFORMS Optimization Society Young Researchers Prize. She became a distinguished lecturer of the IEEE Systems Council in 2022. She was named to the 2026 class of IEEE Fellows, "for contributions to optimization and learning techniques for complex systems".
