= Carlos Canudas de Wit =

French engineer

Carlos Canudas de Wit from the GIPSA-lab, Grenoble, France was named Fellow of the Institute of Electrical and Electronics Engineers (IEEE) in 2016 for contributions to modeling and control of mechanical, robotic, and networked systems.
