= Maria Elena Valcher =

Maria Elena Valcher is an Italian control theorist, and a professor at the Department of Information Engineering at the University of Padova.

Valcher was the president for IEEE Control Systems Society in 2015. She was named Fellow of the Institute of Electrical and Electronics Engineers (IEEE) in 2012, "for contributions to positive systems theory and the behavioral approach to system analysis and control". She is also a Fellow of the International Federation of Automatic Control.
