= Jorge Cortes =

Spanish engineer

Jorge Cortés is a Spanish engineer and professor at the Department of Mechanical and Aerospace Engineering, University of California, San Diego. He is the author of Geometric, Control and Numerical Aspects of Nonholonomic Systems.

== Education and career ==
In 2001, Jorge Cortés received his Ph.D. in engineering mathematics from Charles III University of Madrid. He became a postdoctoral research associate at the University of Twente from 2001 to 2002, and continued his postdoctoral research at the University of Illinois at Urbana-Champaign from 2002 to 2004. He then worked as an assistant professor at University of California, Santa Cruz from 2004 to 2007. He subsequently joined the University of California, San Diego faculty as a professor.

== Awards and honors ==
He was elected SIAM fellow in 2020. The IEEE granted him an equivalent honor in 2014.
