= Lacra Pavel =

Romanian and Canadian game theorist

Lăcrămioara Pavel (born 1965) is a Romanian and Canadian game theorist and electrical engineer whose research applies game theory to network controllability for communications networks and transport networks. She is a professor of electrical and computer engineering at the University of Toronto.

== Education and career ==
Pavel graduated from the Gheorghe Asachi Technical University of Iași in Romania in 1989. She received a Ph.D. in electrical engineering in 1996, from Queen's University at Kingston in Canada.

She was a postdoctoral researcher for National Research Council Canada and then worked in industry before returning to academia in 2002, as a faculty member at the University of Toronto. She was promoted to full professor in 2013.

== Book ==
Pavel is the author of the book Game Theory for Control of Optical Networks (Birkhäuser, 2012).

== Recognition ==
Pavel was named to the 2025 class of IEEE Fellows "for contributions to game theory, control, and optimization for network systems".
