= Luca Zaccarian =

Luca Zaccarian from LAAS-CNRS, Toulouse, France, and the University of Trento, Trento, Italy was named Fellow of the Institute of Electrical and Electronics Engineers (IEEE) in 2016 for contributions to the development and application of nonlinear and hybrid control systems.
