= Dorothée Normand-Cyrot =

French applied mathematician

Dorothée Normand-Cyrot is a French applied mathematician and control theorist, known for her work on discrete-time nonlinear control systems.

== Education and career ==
As a teenager entering the French university system in 1971, Normand-Cyrot found the grandes écoles closed off to her because she was female; instead she went to a lesser university to study mathematics. Her mentors included algebraist Andrée Ehresmann and, a few years later, control theorist Michel Fliess.

Normand-Cyrot worked for two years for Électricité de France, earned a doctorat de troisième cycle in mathematics in 1978 at Paris Diderot University, became a researcher for the French National Centre for Scientific Research (CNRS) in 1981, and completed her doctorat d'état in 1983 at Paris-Sud University. She became a director of research for CNRS in 1991, and was posted by CNRS to the Laboratoire des signaux et systèmes at Paris-Saclay University.

== Recognition ==
Normand-Cyrot was named an IEEE Fellow in 2005, "for contributions to discrete-time and digital nonlinear control systems".
