= Maurice Heemels =

Maurice Heemels is a Full Professor at the Eindhoven University of Technology, Eindhoven, Netherlands. He was named Fellow of the Institute of Electrical and Electronics Engineers (IEEE) in 2016 for contributions to analysis and design of hybrid, networked, and event-triggered systems.

== Education and career ==
Heemels obtained M.Sc. (in mathematics) and the Ph.D. (in control theory), both of which were summa cum laude, from the Eindhoven University of Technology, the Netherlands, in 1995 and 1999, respectively. Following graduation, Heemels served with the Department of Electrical Engineering at Eindhoven University of Technology and from 2004 to 2006 worked at Embedded Systems Institute. During those years, he also worked for Océ and the Department of Mechanical Engineering at his alma mater. In 2001, he was a visiting professor at ETH Zurich and in 2008 held the same position at the University of California, Santa Barbara. He served on the editorial boards of Annual Reviews in Control, Automatica, Nonlinear Analysis: Hybrid Systems, and IEEE Transactions on Automatic Control.
