= IEEE Transactions on Control Systems Technology =

- Discipline: Control systems technology
- Language: English
- Edited by: Andrea Serrani

Publication details
- History: 1993–present
- Publisher: IEEE Control Systems Society
- Frequency: Bimonthly
- Impact factor: 5.312 (2019)

Standard abbreviations
- ISO 4: IEEE Trans. Control Syst. Technol.

Indexing
- CODEN: IETTE2
- ISSN: 1063-6536 (print); 1558-0865 (web)
- LCCN: 94648285
- OCLC no.: 807599104

Links
- Journal homepage; Online access

The IEEE Transactions on Control Systems Technology is published bimonthly by the IEEE Control Systems Society. The journal publishes papers, letters, tutorials, surveys, and perspectives on control systems technology. The editor-in-chief is Prof. Andrea Serrani (Ohio State University). According to the Journal Citation Reports, the journal has a 2019 impact factor of 5.312.
