= Mario Sznaier =

Uruguayan electrical engineer and control theorist

- Born: Uruguay
- Education: Universidad de la República (Ing. Electrónico, Ing. en Sistemas de Computación); University of Washington (MSEE, PhD)
- Known for: Robust control, identification of switched systems, dynamics-enabled machine learning
- Awards: IEEE Fellow (2019); IEEE Control Systems Society Distinguished Member Award (2012)
- Scientific career
- Fields: Control theory, robust control, system identification, computer vision, machine learning
- Workplaces: Northeastern University; Pennsylvania State University; University of Central Florida
- Website: robustsystems.coe.neu.edu

Mario Sznaier is a Uruguayan-born electrical engineer and control theorist who holds the Dennis Picard Trustee Professorship in the Department of Electrical and Computer Engineering at Northeastern University. His research spans robust control, system identification, semi-algebraic optimization, dynamics-enabled machine learning, and dynamic computer vision. He is a Fellow of the IEEE and a recipient of the IEEE Control Systems Society Distinguished Member Award.

== Education ==
Sznaier received his Ingeniero Electrónico and Ingeniero en Sistemas de Computación degrees from the Universidad de la República in Uruguay. He earned his MSEE and PhD from the University of Washington.

== Career ==
From 1991 to 1993, Sznaier was an assistant professor of electrical engineering at the University of Central Florida. In 1993, he joined the Pennsylvania State University, where he was promoted to associate professor in 1997 and to professor of electrical engineering in 2001. He held visiting appointments at the California Institute of Technology in 1990 and 2000.

In July 2006, Sznaier joined Northeastern University as the Dennis Picard Trustee Professor of Electrical and Computer Engineering. He directs the Robust Systems Lab at Northeastern.

== Research ==
Sznaier's research focuses on the intersection of control theory, optimization, and machine learning. His principal contributions include work on the identification and control of switched systems, multiobjective robust control, and the application of semi-algebraic and convex optimization techniques to data-driven control problems.

His group has also applied dynamical systems theory to computer vision problems, including multiple-target tracking and causal inference in video sequences, with publications at the IEEE Conference on Computer Vision and Pattern Recognition (CVPR) and the IEEE International Conference on Computer Vision (ICCV).

Sznaier has led or co-led major funded research projects, including a $7.5 million Department of Defense Multidisciplinary University Research Initiative (MURI) on artificial intelligence for unmanned aerial vehicles, in collaboration with the University of Texas at Austin and Princeton University.

== Professional service ==
Sznaier served as Executive Director of the IEEE Control Systems Society (2007–2011) and as a member of its Board of Governors (2006–2014). He was Program Chair of the 2017 IEEE Conference on Decision and Control and General Chair of the 2016 IEEE Multi-Conference on Systems and Control. He chaired the IEEE CSS Technical Committee on Computational Aspects of Control Systems Design (2013–2017) and currently chairs the IFAC Technical Committee on Robust Control.

He serves as an associate editor for Automatica and as editor-in-chief for the AI and Machine Learning Control section of Frontiers in Control Engineering.

== Honours and awards ==
- IEEE Fellow (2019), "for contributions to identification of switched systems and multiobjective control"
- IEEE Control Systems Society Distinguished Member Award (2012), "for contributions to robust control, identification and dynamic vision"
