= Simona Onori =

Italian automotive, energy, and electrical engineer

Simona Onori is an Italian and American automotive, energy, electrical engineer, and control theorist whose research focuses on energy storage, energy management, and battery health in hybrid and electric vehicles. Her work has shown that the variable energy usage patterns of typical electric vehicles, compared to the steady draw-down and charging rates used in experiments, can extend battery lifetime beyond conventional expectations. She works at Stanford University in the US as an associate professor in the Department of Energy Science & Engineering, director of the Stanford Energy Control Lab, and an affiliate of the Department of Electrical Engineering and the Precourt Institute for Energy. She is also the editor in chief of the SAE International Journal of Electrified Vehicles.

== Education and career ==
Onori received a laurea in 2003 from the University of Rome Tor Vergata, and went to the University of New Mexico for a 2004 master's degree. She returned to Tor Vergata for a Ph.D. in control engineering, completed in 2007.

After working in the aerospace industry, she became a postdoctoral researcher at Ohio State University. It was through this work that she began applying her expertise in control theory to automotive engineering. She became an assistant professor at Clemson University in 2013, and moved to Stanford University in 2017. She became editor-in-chief of the SAE International Journal of Electrified Vehicles in 2020.

== Book ==
Onori is a coauthor of Hybrid Electric Vehicles: Energy Management Strategies (with Lorenzo Serrao and Giorgio Rizzoni), Springer, 2015.

== Recognition ==
Onori is a 2018 recipient of the Ralph R. Teetor Educational Award of SAE International. In 2020 she received the C3E research award of the U.S. Clean Energy Education & Empowerment Initiative.

She was named as a Fellow of SAE International in 2022, "recognized for her groundbreaking research on vehicle electrification, energy storage technologies, and advanced estimation in tailpipe exhaust emission devices". She was named to the 2026 class of IEEE Fellows, "for contributions to energy systems modeling, control, and optimization".
