= John Nelson Chiasson =

American electrical engineer

John Nelson Chiasson (16 May 1952 - 25 February 2025) was an associate professor in the Electrical and Computer Engineering department at Boise State University. Before joining Boise State University, he worked at the Department of Electrical Engineering of University of Pittsburgh and University of Tennessee, Knoxville.

== Education ==
Chiasson earned a BS in mathematics from the University of Arizona, an MS in Electrical Engineering from Washington State University, and a PhD in Control Science from the University of Minnesota.

== Career ==
Chiasson was named Fellow of the Institute of Electrical and Electronics Engineers (IEEE) in 2012 for contributions to control of electric machines and power converters.

He died of natural causes on February 25, 2025.
