= Michael Demetriou =

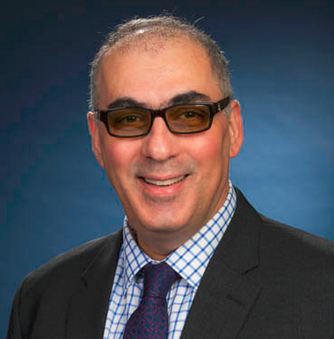

Michael A. Demetriou is a professor of aerospace engineering at the Worcester Polytechnic Institute in Massachusetts. He was named a Fellow of the Institute of Electrical and Electronics Engineers in 2015 for his contributions to estimation and optimization of distributed parameter systems.

== Education and career ==
Demetriou got his BS magna cum laude in mechanical engineering from the University of Southern California in 1987. He remained at his alma mater, during which time he obtained MS in applied mathematics and electrical and computer engineering in 1989 and 1990, respectively. After graduating with a Ph.D. in electrical and computer engineering systems from the University of Southern California in 1993, Demetriou joined Worcester Polytechnic Institute. While at WPI, he served as an associate editor of the IEEE Transactions on Automatic Control from 2004 to 2007 and from 2009 to 2011 held the same position at the ASME Journal of Dynamic Systems, Measurement, and Control. Since 1997, Demetriou has served as an associate editor on the IEEE-Control Systems Society Conference Editorial Board and in 2009 became an assistant editor of the SIAM J. Control and Optimization. Demetriou founded IEEE-CSS Technical Committee on Distributed Parameter Systems in 2003, serving as its chair until 2012. Currently he is a member of both the SIAM/SIAG Advisory Committee and the SIAG/CST Conference Steering Committee, as well as a secretary of the SIAM Control and Systems Theory activity group. He also is a director of the American Automatic Control Council Board of SIAM.
