= Maria Prandini =

Italian electrical engineer (born 1969)

Maria Prandini (born 8 September 1969) is an Italian electrical engineer whose research topics have included control theory, pursuit–evasion, and air traffic control. She is a professor at the Polytechnic University of Milan.

== Education and career ==
Prandini was born in Brescia, earned a laurea in electrical engineering in 1994 from the Polytechnic University of Milan, and completed her Ph.D. in 1998 at the University of Brescia, with Marco Claudio Campi as her doctoral supervisor.

After postdoctoral research with Shankar Sastry at the University of California, Berkeley, and visiting positions at Delft University of Technology and the University of Cambridge, she became an assistant professor at the Polytechnic University of Milan in 2002.

== Recognition ==
In 2020, Prandini was named an IEEE Fellow, affiliated with the IEEE Control Systems Society, "for contributions to stochastic, hybrid and distributed control systems theory".
