= Hong Chen (engineer) =

Chinese engineer (born 1963)

Hong Chen (Chinese: 陈虹, born 1963) is a Chinese engineer specializing in control theory and its application to automotive control systems and automated driving. She is a distinguished professor of control science and engineering at Tongji University in Shanghai,, dean of the Tongji University College of Electronic and Information Engineering, and holder of the Porsche Chair at Tongji University.

== Education and career ==
Chen was a student of process control at Zhejiang University, where she earned a bachelor's degree in 1983 and a master's degree in 1986. In 1986, she joined the faculty of Jilin University. She went to the University of Stuttgart in Germany for doctoral study in system dynamics and control engineering, beginning in 1993, and completed her Ph.D. there in 1997. Her dissertation, Stability and Robustness Considerations in Nonlinear Model Predictive Control, was supervised by Frank Allgöwer.

She returned to Jilin in 1999 as a professor, later becoming Tang Aoqing Professor and Director of the State Key Laboratory of Automotive Simulation and Control. In 2019 she moved to Tongji University as a distinguished professor; she was named as the dean of the College of Electronic and Information Engineering in 2020.

== Recognition ==
Chen was elected as an IEEE Fellow, in the 2023 class of fellows, "for contributions to predictive control and applications in automotive systems".
