= Discrete-event dynamic system =

In control engineering, a discrete-event dynamic system (DEDS) is a discrete-state, event-driven system of which the state evolution depends entirely on the occurrence of asynchronous discrete events over time. Although similar to continuous-variable dynamic systems (CVDS), DEDS consists solely of discrete state spaces and event-driven state transition mechanisms.

Topics in DEDS include:

- Automata theory
- Supervisory control theory
- Petri net theory
- Discrete event system specification
- Boolean differential calculus
- Markov chain
- Queueing theory
- Discrete-event simulation
- Concurrent estimation
