= Mehmet Önder Efe =

Turkish control systems engineer and academic

- Born: Turkey
- Education: Istanbul Technical University (B.Sc., 1993); Boğaziçi University (M.Sc., 1996; Ph.D., 2000)
- Known for: Data-driven control, sliding-mode control, UAV control
- Awards: TÜBA Copyrighted Work Award (2012, 2013, 2014); Boğaziçi University Ph.D. Thesis Award
- Scientific career
- Fields: Control systems; Robotics; Neural networks; Unmanned aerial vehicles; Machine learning
- Workplaces: Hacettepe University; University of Turkish Aeronautical Association; TOBB University of Economics and Technology; Ohio State University; Carnegie Mellon University; Boğaziçi University
- Doctoral advisor: Okyay Kaynak
- Website: web.cs.hacettepe.edu.tr/~onderefe/

Mehmet Önder Efe is a Turkish control systems engineer and academic. He is a professor in the Department of Computer Engineering at Hacettepe University in Ankara, Turkey, where his research focuses on control systems, robotics, neural networks, unmanned aerial vehicles, and machine learning. He served as co-Editor-in-Chief of Transactions of the Institute of Measurement and Control from 2017 to 2022 and has held associate editor positions at several IEEE journals.

== Early life and education ==
Efe completed his B.Sc. in Electronics and Communications Engineering at Istanbul Technical University in 1993. He went on to obtain his M.Sc. in Systems and Control Engineering from Boğaziçi University in 1996, and his Ph.D. in Electrical and Electronics Engineering from the same institution in June 2000, under the supervision of Okyay Kaynak. His doctoral dissertation was recognised with the Ph.D. Thesis Award of the Boğaziçi University Research Fund.

== Career ==
Between August 1996 and December 2000, Efe was a research assistant at the Mechatronics Research and Application Center of Boğaziçi University. In 2001 he joined Carnegie Mellon University as a postdoctoral research fellow in the Department of Electrical and Computer Engineering, where he was a member of the Advanced Mechatronics Laboratory and worked on a distributed robotics project funded by the U.S. Defense Advanced Research Projects Agency (DARPA). From January 2002 to July 2003 he was a postdoctoral research associate at the Ohio State University Department of Electrical Engineering, contributing to an aerospace research project supported by the Air Force Office of Scientific Research (AFOSR).

Following his return to Turkey, he served as an assistant professor in the Department of Mechatronics Engineering at Atılım University from 2003 to 2004. In 2004, he moved to the Department of Electrical and Electronics Engineering at TOBB University of Economics and Technology as an associate professor, and in 2009 he was promoted to professor at the same institution. He chaired the department from 2004 to 2007 and again from 2008 to 2010, and took part in establishing the university's master's and doctoral programs in electrical and electronics engineering.

From 2010 to 2011, he worked as a professor in the Department of Electrical and Electronics Engineering at Bahçeşehir University. In 2011, he was appointed professor at the University of Turkish Aeronautical Association, where from 2011 to 2013 he served as dean and vice rector in the Department of Flight Training of the Faculty of Air Transportation.

In 2013, he joined the Department of Computer Engineering in the Faculty of Engineering at Hacettepe University as a professor, and chaired the department from 2015 to 2018. He has headed the Computer Hardware Division since 2013 and, since 2014, the Division of Digital Communication Systems and Computer Networks at Hacettepe University's Informatics Institute.

== Research ==
Efe's research lies at the intersection of control theory and machine intelligence. His published work includes contributions to sliding mode control, adaptive control, disturbance observer design, fuzzy logic-based control, proper orthogonal decomposition-based reduced-order modelling of distributed parameter systems, and the design and control of quadrotor and other unmanned aerial platforms. More recent research, carried out with collaborators in Europe and East Asia, has addressed adaptive disturbance and uncertainty estimators for linear time-invariant systems, equivalent-input-disturbance methods for unmatched systems, and continual-learning approaches based on switched neural networks with preselected masks.

According to Google Scholar, his publications have received more than 5,000 citations. He has authored or co-authored more than 210 technical publications, including conference proceedings, journal articles, and book chapters.

== Editorial and professional service ==
Efe served as co-Editor-in-Chief of Transactions of the Institute of Measurement and Control, published by SAGE on behalf of the Institute of Measurement and Control, between 2017 and 2022, after which he continued to serve on the journal's advisory board. He has also been an editor of Measurement and Control and a founding editor of an IEEE journal in the area of artificial intelligence.

He has served as associate editor for several IEEE periodicals, including IEEE Transactions on Industrial Electronics, IEEE Transactions on Industrial Informatics, IEEE/ASME Transactions on Mechatronics, and IEEE Transactions on Artificial Intelligence. Additional editorial board appointments have included the Turkish Journal of Electrical Engineering and Computer Sciences, Mathematical Problems in Engineering, Advances in Fuzzy Systems, and International Journal of Industrial Electronics and Control.

Efe is among the founding members of the Turkish chapter of the IEEE Computational Intelligence Society, established in 2025.

== Awards ==
Efe is a three-time recipient of the Turkish Academy of Sciences (TÜBA) Copyrighted Work Award, given to outstanding academic textbooks in Turkish:

- 2011 / 2012 – for the two-volume Circuit Analysis I and Circuit Analysis II.
- 2014 – for Automatic Control Systems.

He also received the Ph.D. Thesis Award of the Boğaziçi University Research Fund for his doctoral work.

== Selected books ==
- Efe, Mehmet Önder (2024). Discrete Time Control Systems (in Turkish). Ankara: Palme Yayıncılık. ISBN 978-625-6441-69-9.
- Efe, Mehmet Önder (2012). Otomatik Kontrol Sistemleri [Automatic Control Systems] (in Turkish). Ankara: Seçkin Yayıncılık. ISBN 978-975-02-1990-0.
- Efe, Mehmet Önder (2011). Devre Analizi II [Circuit Analysis II] (in Turkish). Ankara: Seçkin Yayıncılık. ISBN 978-975-02-1620-6.
- Efe, Mehmet Önder (2011). Devre Analizi I [Circuit Analysis I] (in Turkish). Ankara: Seçkin Yayıncılık. ISBN 978-975-02-1467-7.
- Efe, Mehmet Önder; Kaynak, Okyay (2000). Yapay Sinir Ağları ve Uygulamaları [Artificial Neural Networks and Their Applications] (in Turkish). Istanbul: Boğaziçi University Publications. ISBN 975-518-223-3.
