= Vadim Utkin =

Russian control theorist, electrical engineer (1937–2022)

Vadim Ivanovich Utkin
- Born: 30 October 1937; Moscow, Soviet Union
- Died: 18 September 2022 (aged 84); Columbus, OH, US
- Education: Moscow Power Engineering Institute (Dipl. Eng.); Institute of Control Sciences (Ph.D., Dr.Sc.)
- Known for: Sliding Mode Control; Variable Structure System; Utkin Observer
- Awards: Lenin Prize (1972); Oldenburger Medal (2003); Humboldt Prize (2005); IEEE Fellow
- Scientific career
- Fields: Electrical engineering Control theory
- Workplaces: Ohio State University; Institute of Control Sciences
- Thesis: Variable Structure Systems and Sliding Mode Control
- Doctoral advisor: Boris Nikolaevich Petrov

Vadim Ivanovich Utkin (Russian: Вадим Иванович Уткин; 30 October 1937 – 18 September 2022) was a Russian-American control theorist, electrical engineer and a professor of Electrical Engineering and Mechanical Engineering at the Ohio State University. He is best known for being one of the originators of Sliding Mode Control and Variable Structure Systems, which have become fundamental concepts in the field of nonlinear control (e.g. robust control).

== Biography ==
Utkin was born in Moscow, Soviet Union. He was with the Institute of Control Sciences from 1960 to 1994, where he served as its Head of Discontinuous Control Systems Laboratory from 1973 to 1994. He joined the Ohio State University in 1994 as the Ford Chair of Electromechanical Systems, and was the first professor to hold this distinction until 2002.

He was an IEEE Fellow, and he has been the recipient of awards such as the Lenin Prize and the Humboldt Prize. He also holds honorary doctorates from the University of Sarajevo and Rovira and Vergil University.

== Selected works ==
- Sliding Modes and their Applications in Variable Structure Systems. Mir, Moscow, 1978.
- Sliding Modes in Control and Optimization, Springer Verlag, 1992.
- Sliding Mode Control in Electro-Mechanical Systems, Taylor & Frencis. 1st edition 1999, 2nd edition 2009.
