= Sarah Spurgeon =

British electrical engineer

Sarah Spurgeon OBE FREng
- Born: Sarah Katherine Mudge; December 4, 1963 (age 62); Wolverhampton
- Education: Ounsdale High School
- Alma mater: University of York (BSc, DPhil)
- Known for: Control Engineering
- Scientific career
- Fields: Electrical engineering Sliding mode controls
- Institutions: University College London; University of Kent; Loughborough University; University of Leicester
- Thesis: An assessment of robustness of flight control systems based on variable structure techniques (2003)
- Website: www.ucl.ac.uk/electronic-electrical-engineering/people/prof-sarah-spurgeon

Sarah Katherine Spurgeon OBE FREng (born 4 December 1963) is the Head of Department of Electronic and Electrical Engineering at University College London. She served as President of the Engineering Professors' Council from 2017 to 2019. She has previously served as head of the Department of Engineering at both the University of Leicester and University of Kent.

== Early life and education ==
Spurgeon was born in Wolverhampton. She is the daughter of Michael and Sheila Mudge. She attended Ounsdale High School. She studied mathematics at the University of York, and earned her Bachelor's degree in 1985 and Doctor of Philosophy degree in engineering in 1988.

== Research and career ==
After completing her studies Spurgeon first moved to Loughborough University, where she worked as a lecturer, before joining the University of Leicester in 1991.

Spurgeon is a control engineer. She works to optimise different systems, including aeroplanes, cars, robots and healthcare. Her contributions to control engineering include sliding mode control and variable structure control. When setting up a control problem there are mismatches between the plant and model used for control design. Spurgeon's sliding mode control theory produces controllers that overcome these discrepancies.

=== Academic service ===
In 2006 Spurgeon was Head of the Department of Engineering at the University of Leicester. She moved to the University of Kent in 2008, where she was made Head of the School of Engineering and Digital Arts. In 2011 she was appointed the Institute of Electrical and Electronics Engineers Distinguished Lecturer for the Controlled Systems Society. She served as Vice Chair of the International Federation of Automatic Control from 2014 to 2017. During this time she also chaired the Royal Academy of Engineering Ingenious Award panel. In 2015 she was elected President of the Institute of Measurement and Control. In 2016 she joined University College London as Head of Department of Electronic and Electrical Engineering. She serves as the President of the Engineering Professors' Council. She is a member of the Royal Society International Exchanges Committee, who make decisions on international exchange programs including the Yusuf and Farida Hamied Foundation International Exchange Award and the Royal Society of Chemistry Exchange Award. As of 2019 she serves on the board of EngineeringUK and the Defence Science and Technology Laboratory. She serves on the advisory team of the Engineering and Physical Sciences Research Council. She has been involved in the promotion of women in engineering with the Royal Academy of Engineering.

=== Awards and honours ===
Her awards and honours include;

- 2000 Institute of Electrical and Electronics Engineers Millennium Medal
- 2004 Elected Fellow of the Institute of Measurement and Control
- 2010 Institute of Measurement and Control Honeywell International Medal
- 2008 Elected Fellow of the Royal Academy of Engineering (FREng)
- 2015 Elected President-Elect of the Engineering Professors' Council
- 2015 Appointed Order of the British Empire in the 2015 New Year Honours
- 2019 Elected Fellow of IEEE

=== Selected publications ===
Her publications include;

- Spurgeon, Sarah (2016). Variable Structure Control of Complex Systems: Analysis and Design. Springer. ISBN 9783319489629.
- Spurgeon, Sarah (1998). Sliding Mode Control: Theory And Applications. CRC Press. ISBN 9780748406012.
- Spurgeon, Sarah (2000). "Sliding mode observers for fault detection and isolation". Automatica. 36 (4): 541–553. doi:10.1016/S0005-1098(99)00177-6.
- Spurgeon, Sarah (1993). "On the development of discontinuous observers". International Journal of Control. 59 (5): 1211–1229. doi:10.1080/00207179408923128.

== Personal life ==
Spurgeon is married to Christopher Thomas Spurgeon. Together they have three children.
