= Wassim Michael Haddad =

Lebanese-Greek-American mathematician

Wassim M. Haddad
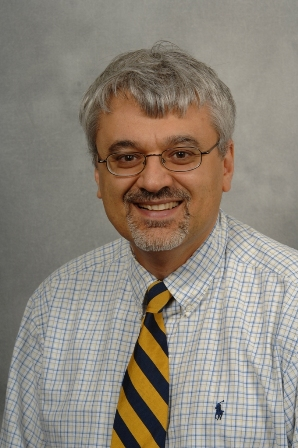
- Born: July 14, 1961 (age 65); Athens, Greece
- Education: Florida Institute of Technology
- Awards: Presidential Faculty Fellow; Academy of Nonlinear Sciences; IEEE Fellow; AIAA Associate Fellow
- Scientific career
- Fields: Aerospace Engineering; Mathematics; Dynamical Systems; Control Theory
- Workplaces: Florida Institute of Technology; Georgia Institute of Technology
- Doctoral advisor: Dennis S. Bernstein

Wassim Michael Haddad (born July 14, 1961) is a Lebanese-Greek-American applied mathematician, scientist, and engineer, with research specialization in the areas of dynamical systems and control. His research has led to fundamental breakthroughs in applied mathematics, thermodynamics, stability theory, robust control, dynamical system theory, and neuroscience.

Haddad is a member of the faculty of the School of Aerospace Engineering at Georgia Institute of Technology, where he holds the rank of Professor and Chair of the Flight Mechanics and Control Discipline. He is a member of the Academy of Nonlinear Sciences for recognition of paramount contributions to the fields of nonlinear stability theory, nonlinear dynamical systems, and nonlinear control and an IEEE Fellow for contributions to robust, nonlinear, and hybrid control systems. He was awarded the Pendray Aerospace Literature Award by the AIAA in 2014.

== Biography ==
=== Early life and education ===
Haddad was born in Athens, Greece, to a Greek mother and Lebanese father. He attended a private British secondary school for his early education and the American Community Schools in Athens and Beirut, respectively, for his high school education. After completing his high school, where he was taught Greek, French, philosophy, and basic science and mathematics, in 1979 he entered the Mechanical and Aerospace Engineering Department of the Florida Institute of Technology in Melbourne, Florida. Haddad received the B.S., M.S., and Ph.D. degrees in mechanical engineering from Florida Tech in 1983, 1984, and 1987, respectively, with specialization in dynamical systems and control. His doctoral research concentrated on fixed-architecture robust control design with applications to large flexible space structures and with Dennis S. Bernstein serving as his doctoral advisor.

=== Academic career ===
From 1987 to 1994 Haddad served as a consultant for the Structural Controls Group of the Government Aerospace Systems Division, Harris Corporation, Melbourne, Florida. In 1988 he joined the faculty of the Mechanical and Aerospace Engineering Department at Florida Institute of Technology, where he founded and developed the Systems and Control Option within the graduate program and was instrumental in bolstering control systems activities within the Space Research Institute at the Florida Tech. Since 1994 he has been a member of the faculty in the School of Aerospace Engineering at the Georgia Institute of Technology.

=== Presidential Faculty Fellow ===
In recognition for his "demonstrated excellence and continued promise in scientific and engineering research and in teaching future generations of students to extend and apply human knowledge," Professor Haddad was awarded the National Science Foundation Presidential Faculty Fellow Award in 1993. The award was bestowed by President Bill Clinton in a White House Rose Garden ceremony to recognize and support the scholarly activities of the "Nation's most outstanding science and engineering faculty" members.

== Research ==
Dr. Haddad's interdisciplinary research contributions are documented in over 550 archival journal and conference publications and seven books in the areas of science, mathematics, medicine, and engineering. His research in nonlinear robust and adaptive control, nonlinear dynamical system theory, large-scale systems, hierarchical nonlinear switching control, analysis and control of nonlinear impulsive and hybrid systems, adaptive and neuroadaptive control, system thermodynamics, thermodynamic modeling of mechanical and aerospace systems, network systems, expert systems, nonlinear analysis and control for biological and physiological systems, active control for clinical pharmacology, and mathematical neuroscience have placed him as one of the prominent scholars, educators, and technology developers in the aerospace, electrical, and biomedical engineering communities. His secondary interests include the history of science and mathematics, as well as natural philosophy.

=== Fixed-structure control design ===
In a series of papers with D. S. Bernstein and D. C. Hyland in the mid-1980s on the subject of "optimal projection fixed-structure control," Haddad solved several important problems concerning the design of reduced-order optimally robust compensators and estimators for multivariable systems. Haddad's fixed-structure control framework provides the capability for simultaneously performing multiple design tradeoffs for multivariable systems with respect to competing constraints such as sensor noise, control effort, controller order, robustness, disturbance rejection, mean-square error, sample rate, and controller architecture. This approach provides the theoretical underpinning for the design of "industry standard" controllers that fully encompass classical design objectives within multivariable control theory. This work provided the foundation for numerous researchers in the 1990s to address advances in fixed-order control via Linear Matrix Inequalities (LMIs).

=== Mixed-norm multiobjective control design ===
Haddad's work on the mixed-norm multiobjective controller synthesis problem and, specifically, the mixed H_{2}/H_{∞} control problem, was the first to correctly and rigorously fully address the design of full- and reduced-order controllers for disturbance rejection that simultaneously account for narrow-band and wide-band disturbances without undue conservativeness. Haddad's seminal publications on the mixed-norm control problem spawned an extremely active area of research, with numerous papers being written by different research groups around the world that drew heavily on this foundational work.

=== Robust control for systems with structured uncertainty ===
This work was the first to satisfactorily address the then open problem on robust stability and performance problems for constant real parameter uncertainty in the literature via parameter-dependent Lyapunov functions. The work provided a fundamental generalization of mixed-μ analysis and synthesis in terms of Lyapunov functions and Riccati equations. This unification between mixed-μ and parameter-dependent Lyapunov functions resulted in new machinery for mixed-μ controller synthesis by providing the basis for a reliable, fully automated μ-synthesis procedure while, for the first time, simultaneously capturing H_{2} performance while avoiding suboptimal multiplier-controller iteration and curve-fitting procedures. This research has produced advanced theoretical breakthroughs directly supporting engineering practice.

=== Propulsion control for rotating stall and surge ===
Haddad's work in this area concentrated in the development of advanced nonlinear robust disturbance rejection control methodologies for nonlinear systems with applications to flow control associated with aerospace vehicles. Specifically, he developed an optimality-based nonlinear control framework to synthesize robust globally stabilizing disturbance rejection controllers for nonlinear systems with structured nonlinear parametric uncertainty and uncertain exogenous disturbances. His results have been applied to combustion systems to suppress the effects of thermoacoustic instabilities in gas turbine engines as well as propulsion systems to control the aerodynamic instabilities of rotating stall and surge in jet engines. This research has demonstrated concrete improvements in compression system performance, robustness, reliability, and maintainability in highly visible United States Department of Defense projects under the support of National Science Foundation, AFOSR, ARO, and NASA. His book Hierarchical Nonlinear Switching Control Design with Application to Propulsion Systems, London, UK: Springer-Verlag, 2000, in this area provides a novel and unique hierarchical nonlinear switching control framework for general nonlinear uncertain systems giving a rigorous alternative to gain scheduling control for systems with multiple modes of operation.

=== Thermodynamics ===
Haddad's Thermodynamics: A Dynamical Systems Approach, Princeton, NJ: Princeton University Press, 2005, develops a novel and unique system-theoretic framework of thermodynamics. Thermodynamics is one of the bedrock disciplines of physics and engineering, yet its foundation has been lacking rigor and clarity as very eloquently pointed out by the American mathematician and natural philosopher Clifford Truesdell. Over the years, researchers from the systems and control community have acknowledged the need for developing a solid foundation for thermodynamics. Haddad's book brings together a vast range of ideas and tools to construct a powerful framework for thermodynamics. He uses dissipativity theory, nonstandard Lyapunov ideas, and positive system theory in his work. His framework captures all of the key ideas of thermodynamics, including its fundamental laws, providing a harmonization of classical thermodynamics with classical mechanics. The work is a "technical masterpiece" that brings to bear and extends the kind of applied analysis that is hallmark to the dynamical systems and control community. In particular, Haddad's exposition brings coherence and clarity to an important classical area of science and engineering. Extensions of this work are reported in.

=== Impulsive and hybrid dynamical systems ===
Haddad's key work on impulsive and hybrid dynamical systems and control include. His book on Impulsive and Hybrid Dynamical Systems: Stability, Dissipativity, and Control, Princeton, NJ: Princeton University Press, 2006, provides a highly detailed, general analysis and synthesis framework for impulsive and hybrid dynamical systems. In particular, this research monograph develops fundamental results on stability, dissipativity theory, energy-based hybrid control, optimal control, disturbance rejection control, and robust control for nonlinear impulsive and hybrid dynamical systems. The monograph is written from a system-theoretic point of view and provides a fundamental contribution to mathematical system theory and control system theory. "No book in print has the depth and breadth of this book."

=== Nonlinear dynamical systems and control ===
Haddad's research in the area on nonlinear dynamical system theory is highlighted in his textbook on Nonlinear Dynamical Systems and Control: A Lyapunov-Based Approach , Princeton, NJ: Princeton University Press, 2008. This 1000-page "encyclopedic masterpiece" presents and develops an extensive treatment of stability analysis and control design of nonlinear dynamical systems, with an emphasis on Lyapunov-based methods. Topics include Lyapunov stability theory, partial stability, Lagrange stability, boundedness, ultimate boundedness, input-to-state stability, input-output stability, finite-time stability, semistability, stability of sets, stability of periodic orbits, and stability theorems via vector Lyapunov functions. In addition, a complete treatment of dissipativity theory, absolute stability theory, stability of feedback interconnections, optimal control, backstepping control, disturbance rejection control, and robust control via fixed and parameter-dependent Lyapunov functions for nonlinear continuous-time and discrete-time dynamical systems is also given.

=== Nonnegative and compartmental dynamical systems ===
Haddad's treatise on Nonnegative and Compartmental Dynamical Systems, Princeton, NJ: Princeton University Press, 2010, presents a complete analysis and design framework for modeling and feedback control of nonnegative and compartmental dynamical systems. This work is rigorously theoretical in nature yet vitally practical in impact. The concepts are illustrated by examples from biology, chemistry, ecology, economics, genetics, medicine, sociology, and engineering. This book develops a unified stability and dissipativity analysis and control design framework for nonnegative and compartmental dynamical systems in order to foster the understanding of these systems as well as advancing the state-of-the-art in active control of nonnegative and compartmental systems. It has had fundamental ramifications in many areas of intense interest in today's contracting world, where medicine, economics, and sociology in closely interacting populations are becoming more important, where epidemiology and genetics are essential in understanding disease propagation in more and more closely interacting groups, and where real-time control system technology impacts modern medicine through robotic surgery, electrophysiological systems (pacemakers and automatic implantable defibrillators), life support (ventilators, artificial hearts), and image-guided therapy and surgery.

=== Stability and control of large-scale systems ===
In this research, Haddad has brought a longstanding research theme to fruition by his work on vector dissipative systems approaches to large-scale nonlinear dynamical systems. This work has broad application to large-scale aerospace systems, air traffic control systems, power and energy grid systems, manufacturing and processing systems, transportation systems, communication and information networks, integrative biological systems, biological neural networks, biomolecular and biochemical systems, nervous systems, immune systems, environmental and ecological systems, molecular, quantum, and nanoscale systems, particulate and chemical reaction systems, and economic and financial systems, to name but a few examples. His most recent book in this area, Stability and Control of Large-Scale Dynamical Systems: A Vector Dissipative Systems Approach, Princeton, NJ: Princeton University Press, 2011, addresses highly interconnected and mutually interdependent complex aerospace dynamical systems.

=== Control of multiagent network systems ===
In this work, Haddad has merged systems biology and system thermodynamics with network engineering systems to develop functional and robust algorithms for agent coordination and control of autonomous multiagent aerospace systems. In particular, looking to autonomous swarm systems appearing in nature for inspiration, he has developed control algorithms to address agent interactions, cooperative and non-cooperative control, task assignments, and resource allocations for multiagent network systems. This work has had a major impact on cooperative control of unmanned air vehicles, autonomous underwater vehicles, distributed sensor networks, air and ground transportation systems, swarms of air and space vehicle formations, and congestion control in communication networks. His results exploit fundamental links between system thermodynamics and information theory in "ingenious ways" and have initiated major breakthroughs in control of networks and control over networks.

=== Adaptive and neuroadaptive control for clinical pharmacology ===
Haddad's work in this area has tackled one of the most challenging problems in clinical pharmacology. In particular, he has developed adaptive and neural network adaptive control algorithms for automated anesthesia and critical care unit medicine. His adaptive control algorithms adjust to interpatient and intrapatient pharmacokinetic and pharmacodynamic variability and have significantly improved the outcome for drug administration. This research in active control of clinical pharmacology has transitioned to clinical practice and is improving medical care, health care, and reliability of drug dosing equipment, and has a real potential of reducing health care costs. Haddad's achievements in this area have been very influential in the biomedical engineering field. His results in clinical pharmacology are documented in.

== Books ==
- A. Leonessa, W. M. Haddad, and V. Chellaboina, Hierarchical Nonlinear Switching Control Design with Application to Propulsion Systems. London, UK: Springer-Verlag, 2000.
- W. M. Haddad, V. Chellaboina, and S. G. Nersesov, Thermodynamics: A Dynamical Systems Approach. Princeton, NJ: Princeton University Press, 2005.
- W. M. Haddad, V. Chellaboina, and S. G. Nersesov, Impulsive and Hybrid Dynamical Systems: Stability, Dissipativity, and Control. Princeton, NJ: Princeton University Press, 2006.
- W. M. Haddad and V. Chellaboina, Nonlinear Dynamical Systems and Control: A Lyapunov-Based Approach. Princeton, NJ: Princeton University Press, 2008. Erratum
- W. M. Haddad, V. Chellaboina, and Q. Hui, Nonnegative and Compartmental Dynamical Systems. Princeton, NJ: Princeton University Press, 2010.
- W. M. Haddad and S. G. Nersesov, Stability and Control of Large-Scale Dynamical Systems: A Vector Dissipative Systems Approach. Princeton, NJ: Princeton University Press, 2011.
