= Okyay Kaynak =

Turkish electrical engineer and academic (born 1948)

- Mustafa Okyay Kaynak
- Born: 19 April 1948 (age 78); Afyon, Turkey
- Education: University of Birmingham (BSc, PhD)
- Known for: Variable structure systems theory and its applications in mechatronics
- Spouse: Pervin Kaynak
- Children: 1
- Awards: IEEE Fellow (2003); Humboldt Research Prize (2016); China Friendship Award (2016); TÜBA Academy Prize (2020)
- Scientific career
- Fields: Mechatronics · Intelligent control · Sliding mode control · Industrial cyber-physical systems · Artificial intelligence
- Workplaces: Boğaziçi University; Harbin Institute of Technology; University of Science and Technology Beijing
- Thesis: (1972)

Mustafa Okyay Kaynak (born 19 April 1948) is a Turkish electrical engineer and academic. He is professor emeritus at Boğaziçi University in Istanbul and holds the UNESCO Chair on Mechatronics at the same university. Kaynak has contributed to variable structure systems theory, sliding mode control, and the fusion of intelligent control methods with mechatronics and industrial automation.

He served as president of the IEEE Industrial Electronics Society in 2002–2003 and as editor-in-chief of two IEEE Transactions journals. He is a Fellow of the IEEE (2003) and a recipient of the Humboldt Research Award (2016), the China Friendship Award (2016) and the Turkish Academy of Sciences Academy Prize (2020).

== Early life and education ==
Kaynak was born in Afyon, Turkey, on 19 April 1948. After completing GCE Advanced Level courses at North Western Polytechnic in London in 1965–1966, he pursued his higher education in the United Kingdom. He earned a BSc degree with first-class honours in electronic and electrical engineering from the University of Birmingham in 1969, followed by a PhD in the same field from the same university in 1972.

== Career ==
From 1972 to 1979, Kaynak held a number of positions in industry, including approximately three and a half years working as a project engineer in Saudi Arabia.

In 1979, Kaynak joined the Department of Electrical and Electronics Engineering at Boğaziçi University in Istanbul. Over the following decades he held several administrative positions at the university, including chair of the Computer Engineering Department, chair of the Electrical and Electronic Engineering Department, director of the Biomedical Engineering Institute, and director of the Mechatronics Research and Application Center from October 1998 to April 2015. He is currently an emeritus professor and holds the UNESCO Chair on Mechatronics at the university.

Kaynak has held long-term visiting professor or scholar positions of approximately one year or more at institutions in Saudi Arabia, Japan, Germany, the United States, Singapore and China. In 2013 he was awarded a professorship under China's "Thousand Talents" (1000 People) Program at Harbin Institute of Technology. He has also held an affiliation with the University of Science and Technology Beijing.

== Research ==
Kaynak's research has spanned control theory, variable structure systems, sliding mode control, mechatronics, neural networks, fuzzy logic, intelligent control, and, more recently, industrial cyber-physical systems and applications of artificial intelligence to industrial automation and fault diagnosis. He has authored three books, edited five, and authored or co-authored more than 450 articles in journals, books and conference proceedings.

== Editorial work ==
Kaynak has served on the editorial or advisory boards of several scholarly journals in his field. His principal editorial appointments include:

- Editor-in-Chief, IEEE Transactions on Industrial Informatics (2005–2006)
- Co-Editor-in-Chief, IEEE Transactions on Industrial Electronics (2009–2012)
- Editor-in-Chief, IEEE/ASME Transactions on Mechatronics (2014–2016)
- Founding Editor-in-Chief, Discover Artificial Intelligence (Springer)

== Professional service ==
He was president of the IEEE Industrial Electronics Society for the 2002–2003 term.

== Awards and honours ==
Selected awards and recognitions include:

- IEEE Third Millennium Medal (2001)
- Excellence in Research Award, Boğaziçi University (2003)
- APNNA Leadership Award (2003)
- Elected Fellow of the IEEE (2003), "for contributions to variable structure systems theory and its applications in mechatronics"
- IEEE/IES Anthony J. Hornfeck Service Award (2005)
- IEEE/IES Dr.-Ing. Eugene Mittelmann Achievement Award (2011)
- China Friendship Award (2016)
- Humboldt Research Prize, Alexander von Humboldt Foundation (2016)
- Senior Award, Japan Society for the Promotion of Science (2018)
- Doctor honoris causa, Óbuda University, Budapest, Hungary (2020)
- TÜBA Academy Prize in Basic and Engineering Sciences, Turkish Academy of Sciences (2020)

He is a member of the Turkish Academy of Sciences.
