= Huang Jie =

Huang Jie (Wade–Giles: Huang Chieh) or Jie Huang may refer to:

- Huang Chieh (1902–1995), Kuomintang general, Governor of Taiwan Province
- Huang Jie (politician) (born 1993), Taiwanese politician
- Huang Jie (engineer), Chinese mechanical engineer
