= Wombourne High School =

Location
- Ounsdale Road; Wombourne, Staffordshire, WV5 8BJ; England; 52.5354°N 2.1972°W

Information
- Type: Academy
- Established: 1956
- Local authority: Staffordshire
- Department for Education URN: 141343 Tables
- Ofsted: Reports
- Head teacher: Sir Nicholas Bradnick Tomphason
- Gender: Coeducational
- Age: 11 to 18
- Colours: Navy-blue and White
- Website: wombournehighschool.co.uk

Wombourne High School (formerly Ounsdale High School) is a coeducational secondary school and sixth form located in Wombourne, Staffordshire, England. The school has approximately 1,100 pupils and provides education at Key Stage 3, GCSE and sixth form. Its head teacher is Sir Nicholas Bradnick Thompson, who took over from Ms Claire Powell in the nearing end of 2025. Wombourne High School is a part of the Invictus Education Trust, which was set up in 2015 with then-named Ounsdale as one of its founding member. Invictus now include the following schools: Ellowes Hall Sports College, Wombourne High School, Kinver High School, The Crestwood School, Leasowes High School, Pedmore High School, and Rufford Primary School.

81% of the school's GCSE students gained 5 or more GCSEs at grade 4 or higher, with 49% achieving at least one grade 7 or higher. Additionally, 19% of student achieved 5 or more GCSEs at grade 7 or higher.

As of its latest inspection in March 2022, the school was awarded the "Good" rating from Ofsted.

Wombourne High School has a standalone building dedicated to its sixth form, which was opened by the pop singer Beverley Knight.

== History ==
The school opened in September 1956 as a secondary school with a GCE stream. It stood in eighteen acres of playing fields in a rural area five miles south west of Wolverhampton. The first stage of the building works was finished in 1957.

As the school building programme progressed, the three form entry was increased to four in 1957 and five in 1958, at which time the school became fully comprehensive with a non-selected intake. Ounsdale attracted children of all abilities from its catchment area from Pattingham and Patshull in the north to Enville in the south. It provided all secondary level education, grammar, technical and modern, without any clearly defined streaming of individual pupils.

The second stage of building works was completed by September 1960. The school then consisted of three blocks; an administrative block with offices, dining hall, assembly hall, library, gymnasium, indoor heated swimming pool and changing rooms; a three-storey block of 22 classrooms (including specialist rooms for history, geography and music); and a practical block consisting of laboratories for general science, physics, chemistry and biology along with rooms for arts, crafts, needlecraft, domestic science, woodwork, technical drawing and metalwork. Outside were six hard tennis courts, and a school garden with greenhouse, tool shed and potting shed. There were playing fields and hard areas which could be configured for various outdoor sports.

The first headmaster was Harold Holroyde, MA. He retired in March 1975.

Anwar Shemza, the Pakistani artist, worked as a teacher at Ounsdale between 1962 and 1979.

In September 2002, the school was granted specialist school status as an Arts College. This has led to the addition of a slightly modified school motto: Pursuing excellence by developing the creativity of learners through and in the arts.

In March 2015, the school became one of the founding members of the Invictus Education Trust, and converted to academy status. Since being founded in 2015, the Invictus Education Trust has grown to

In 2019, the school changed its name from Ounsdale High School to Wombourne High School.

As a part of the Department for Education's school rebuilding program, Wombourne High School received a share of £1 billion of allocated grant money to use towards the demolition and build of a new Science, technology, engineering, and mathematics (STEM) building. The announcement of the school's inclusion in the scheme by Gavin Williamson took place in June 2020, with the plans for the building being approved by South Staffordshire Council at the start of 2023. The build began in May 2023 and is currently underway.

== Notable former pupils ==
- Christopher Pincher, Conservative MP for Tamworth from 2010 to 2023
- Helene Hewitt (née Banks), climate scientist
- Wendy Sadler, science communicator
- Lydia Thompson, rugby union player
- Alex Hughes, cricketer
- Prof. Sarah Spurgeon OBE FREng FIET, Professor of Control Engineering since 2016 at University College London and from 2008 to 2016 at the University of Kent, Professor of Engineering from 2002 to 2008 at the University of Leicester, President from 2014 to 2017 of the Institute of Measurement and Control
- Adam Lavender, Producer in the video games industry working at Ubisoft Leamington, whose work includes being part of the BAFTA-nominated Guitar Hero Live development team, Call of Duty and Tom Clancy's The Division 1 and 2
