= Wendy Sadler =

British science communicator and lecturer

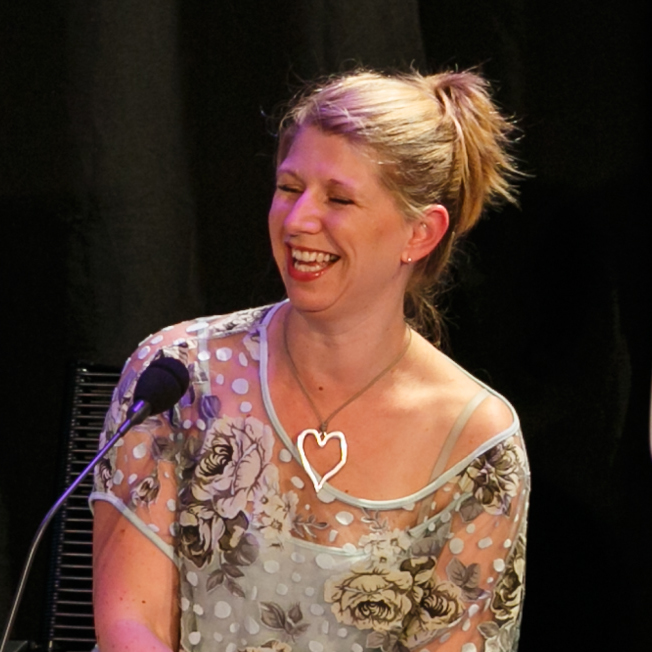
Sadler in 2014

Wendy Sadler MBE FInstP FHEA FLSW is a British science communicator and lecturer at Cardiff University. She is the founding director of Science Made Simple, which focuses on engaging audiences with the physical sciences. Her areas of interest include inspiring the next generation of scientists, engineers and communicators; women in STEM; and making STEM subjects accessible to diverse audiences.

== Early life ==
Sadler was born in 1972 and grew up in Wombourne, England, where she went to Ounsdale High School. She attended Cardiff University and gained a BSc in physics and music in 1994. She gained an MSc in science communication at the Open University, where her dissertation assessed the long-term impact of science demonstration shows.

== Career ==
Sadler started her career at Techniquest.

She began her communications career by creating the non-verbal theatre show called The Experimentrics, which mixed physical theatre and live science demonstrations to create "a world of wordless mystery and fun". She is now a LAMDA accredited public speaker and fellow of the Royal Society of the Arts who has appeared on ITV Wales, BBC Radio and the Edinburgh Fringe Festival to discuss the importance of STEM education

== Public engagement ==
Sadler has published 19 books for children.

In 2010 Sadler gave a TEDxCardiff talk titled, "Music and the Machine".

== Science Made Simple ==
Sadler set up Science Made Simple (SMS) in 2002 with the mission to inspire the next generation of scientists and engineers. At the time, Sadler was an IOP schools lecturer. SMS develops and presents interactive performances that travel to schools and festivals across the world. They have produced shows, contributed to science television, radio programmes, and children's books, trained scientists and acted as consultants on UK research councils. In 2013, she received national media coverage for their tour of UK primary schools following a sell-out run at the Edinburgh Fringe Festival. SMS is also part of a multimillion-pound EU project investigating the use of performance as a tool to engage young people with science and society issues.

== Work with the Welsh Government ==
Sadler is a lecturer and schools' liaison officer at Cardiff University. She is concerned about the state of science education in Wales.

She is a former member of the Science Advisory Council for Wales. She chaired and co-authored the Task and Finish report on STEM engagement in Wales for the National Science Academy and was involved in the writing of the Talented Women for a Successful Wales report.

== Awards and fellowships ==
- 2023 - Elected a Fellow of the Learned Society of Wales
- 2017 - MBE in Queen's Birthday Honours
- 2017 - Institute of Physics William Thomson, Lord Kelvin Medal and Prize
- 2015 - Leading Wales Award for Social Enterprise
- 2009 - Royal Academy of Engineering medal for the Public Promotion of Engineering
- 2008 - UK RC Woman of Outstanding Achievement Award
- 2007 - Descartes Prize for Excellence in Science Communication
- 2007 - Institute of Acoustics' Award for Promoting Acoustics to the Public
- 2005 - Institute of Physics Young Professional Physicist of the Year Award
- 2004 - Women in Science and Engineering Excellence Award
- 2004 - Welsh Woman of the Year (Science and Technology)
