= Double-setpoint control =

Symbol for double-setpoint control

A Double-setpoint control is quite similar to bang–bang control. It is an element of a feedback-loop and therefore evaluated by application of control theory. It has two setpoints on which it switches abruptly usually involving a hysteresis. It may be used in a heating and cooling situation or for two speed control.

The theory was examined by J. Gregory Vermeychuk. The "double-bang-bang" was implemented in the Luft Instruments Model 77 Controller used in a variety of laboratory (titrations) and plant application. Shown in Harvard University Science Museum.
