= Transactions of the Institute of Measurement and Control =

- Discipline: Metrology
- Language: English
- Edited by: Frank L. Lewis, John O'Gray, Steve Thompson, Mehmed Önder Efe

Publication details
- History: 1979-present
- Publisher: SAGE Publications
- Frequency: 8/year
- Impact factor: 1.579 (2017)

Standard abbreviations
- ISO 4: Trans. Inst. Meas. Control

Indexing
- CODEN: TICODG
- ISSN: 0142-3312 (print); 1477-0369 (web)
- LCCN: 80649352
- OCLC no.: 47094421

Links
- Journal homepage; Online access; Online archive

Transactions of the Institute of Measurement and Control is a peer-reviewed academic journal that covers the field of measurement and control systems. The editors-in-chief are Frank L. Lewis (University of Texas at Arlington), John O'Gray, Steve Thompson, and Mehmet Önder Efe (Hacettepe University). It was established in 1979 and is published by SAGE Publications on behalf of the Institute of Measurement and Control.

== Abstracting and indexing ==
The journal is abstracted and indexed in Scopus and the Science Citation Index Expanded. According to the Journal Citation Reports, its 2017 impact factor is 1.579, ranking it 36th out of 61 journals in the category "Automation & Control Systems" and 32nd out of 61 journals in the category "Instruments & Instrumentation".
