= Anwar Shemza =

Pakistani painter

Anwar Jalal Shemza
- Anwar Shemza in 1958
- Born: انور جلال شمزا; 14 July 1928; Shimla, India
- Died: 18 January 1985 (aged 56); Stafford, England
- Education: University of the Punjab; National College of Arts; Slade School of Fine Art
- Known for: Painting, printmaking, novels, poetry, playwright
- Notable work: Meem series (1960s); Roots series (1970s); The Page (1984)
- Movement: Lahore Art Circle (modernist art)
- Spouse: Mary Taylor (1958)
- Website: anwarshemza.com

Anwar Jalal Shemza (Urdu: انور جلال شمزا) (14 July 1928 – 18 January 1985) was an artist and writer active in Pakistan and later the United Kingdom. Despite being better known as an artist, Shemza published several Urdu novels and books of poetry in the 1950s and wrote plays performed on Radio Pakistan. Shemza was initially influenced by Modernism most notably Paul Klee although later works also showed a traditional Islamic influence. He was also an accomplished printmaker, having his work exhibited at the International Print Biennial in Tokyo.

== Early life and career ==
Shemza was born Anwar Jalal Butt into a Kashmiri family in Shimla, India, in 1928. His grandfather owned a carpet business in Lahore while his father Khaja Butt was a civil servant. He was educated in schools in Shimla, Ludhiana and Lahore. While he studied Persian, Arabic and philosophy at Punjab University in 1943, he switched to art the following year, enrolling at the Mayo School of Art and obtaining a diploma in 1947.

== Pakistani artist and writer ==
In 1947, Anwar Shemza opened the Shemza Commercial Art Studio in Lahore and adopted the name Anwar Jalal Shemza. He quickly became a leading figure in Pakistan's cultural life. Shemza was the editor of Ehsas, a magazine on art and architecture. He published seven novels in Urdu most notably Sotey jagtey published in 1957 as well as poetry such as Kissa kahani (Folk tales and stories) from 1954. Radio Pakistan broadcast his plays.

Shemza was a leading member of a modernist group called the Lahore Art Circle. His early works showed a distinct geometric structure. He studied at the Slade School of Fine Art in London and gained a diploma in fine art from University College. In 1960, he obtained a scholarship from the British Council to study printmaking with Anthony Gross for another year. While in Britain, he married English artist Mary Katrina.

== British career ==
Shemza and his wife initially returned to Pakistan, but they later moved to Katrina's hometown of Stafford, England, in 1962. He worked as an arts teacher at Ounsdale High School between 1962 and 1979 and at Weston Road High School as head of art and design between 1979 and 1985.

It was while teaching at Ounsdale in 1966 that Shemza's daughter Tasveer, aged six, designed one of Britain's first series of Christmas stamps. Tasveer's design, featuring one of the Magi, was chosen by eight professional stamp designers from 5,000 entries in a Blue Peter competition.

In England, Shemza started to incorporate Islamic themes into his work. His Meem series of the 1960s was based on the first letter of the prophet Muhammad's name. His Roots series started in the 1970s and showed imaginary plants and roots derived from Arabic script below, while his silkscreen The Page from 1984 showed Arabic letters in illegible patterns.

Exhibitions of Shemza's works were held in London, Durham, Lahore, Karachi, and Oxford. The Roots exhibition toured Pakistan after his death from a heart attack in 1985. He was survived by his wife and two daughters.

== Legacy ==
Anwar Shemza's artworks are held in many public collections including the Ashmolean Museum (Oxford, UK), Guggenheim Abu Dhabi (UAE), Lahore Museum (Lahore, Pakistan), Pakistan National Council of the Arts (Islamabad, Pakistan), Metropolitan Museum of Art (New York, USA), Sharjah Art Foundation (UAE), and Tate (London, UK), His granddaughter, Aphra Shemza, is a multimedia artist. In 2020, she launched an Arts Council-funded project shemza.digital, featuring her grandfather's 1962 painting One to Nine and One to Seven.
