= Huang Jie (engineer) =

Huang Jie (Chinese: 黄捷) is a Choh-Ming Li Professor of Mechanical and Automation Engineering at the Chinese University of Hong Kong.

== Education and career ==
Huang attended Fuzhou University from 1977 to 1979 where he studied power engineering and then studied circuits and systems at Nanjing University of Science and Technology (NUST) from 1979 to 1982. After obtaining a master's degree from NUST, he joined its faculty. In 1986, Huang moved to the United States where he completed his Ph.D. in automatic control at Johns Hopkins University in 1990 and soon after became a postdoc there for one year. From August 1991 to July 1995, Huang worked in American industry. In September of the same year, he joined the Department of Mechanical and Automation Engineering at the Chinese University of Hong Kong where he serves as Choh-Ming Li professor and an Honorary Advisor to the Hong Kong Science Museum.

He is an editor of the International Journal of Robust and Nonlinear Control, is editor-at-large of the Communications in Information and Systems, and a member of advisory board of Transactions of the Institute of Measurement and Control. He also served as an associate editor of the Asian Journal of Control from 1999 to 2001 and held the same position at the IEEE, at its Transactions on Automatic Control. Jie Huang has also been an associate editor of Science in China and was a guest editor for IEEE Transactions on Neural Networks.

== Awards ==
- Fellow of the Institute of Electrical and Electronics Engineers (2005)
- Fellow of the International Federation of Automatic Control (2010)
- State Natural Science Prize, Class II (2011)
