= Helene Hewitt =

British climate scientist

- Born: Helene Theresa Banks
- Education: Cambridge University; University of Southampton
- Scientific career
- Workplaces: Woods Hole Oceanographic Institute
- Thesis: Intrusions and mixing in the Western Equatorial Pacific Ocean. (1996)

Helene Hewitt OBE is a British climate scientist who is a research fellow at the Met Office. Her research considers climate and ocean models. Hewitt serves on the CLIVAR Ocean Model Development Panel. She was awarded an Order of the British Empire in the 2022 Birthday Honours.

== Early life and education ==
Hewitt grew up in Wombourne, Staffordshire, where she attended Ounsdale High School. She studied mathematics at the University of Cambridge, where she was a student at Fitzwilliam College. Hewitt was a doctoral researcher at the University of Southampton, where she studied the Western Equatorial Pacific Ocean. She worked on the World Ocean Circulation Experiment and at the Woods Hole Oceanographic Institution as a doctoral student.

== Research and career ==
In 1996, Hewitt joined the Met Office, where she has developed and assessed climate models. In 2003, Hewitt was made Head of Ocean and Sea Ice model development. Hewitt's model, HadGEM3, combined NEMO and CICE, computational models which simulate the movement of sea ice and ocean circulation.

Hewitt coordinated the IPCC Sixth Assessment Report on the Ocean, Cryosphere and Sea Level Change. She oversees the Ocean Modelling group at the Met Office Hadley Centre, where she develops global and shelf configurations for coupled predictions across multiple different timescales.

Hewitt was appointed an Order of the British Empire in the 2022 Birthday Honours.

== Selected publications ==
- Till Kuhlbrodt; Colin G Jones; Alistair Sellar; et al. (14 November 2018). "The Low-Resolution Version of HadGEM3 GC3.1: Development and Evaluation for Global Climate". Journal of Advances in Modeling Earth Systems. 10 (11): 2865–2888. doi:10.1029/2018ms001370. ISSN 1942-2466. PMC 6360456. PMID 30774751. Wikidata Q64901608.
- Malcolm J. Roberts; Alex Baker; Ed W. Blockley; et al. (3 December 2019). "Description of the resolution hierarchy of the global coupled HadGEM3-GC3.1 model as used in CMIP6 HighResMIP experiments". Geoscientific Model Development. 12 (12): 4999–5028. doi:10.5194/gmd-12-4999-2019. ISSN 1991-959X. Wikidata Q101054549.
- Maialen Iturbide; José M. Gutiérrez; Lincoln M. Alves; et al. (18 November 2020). "An update of IPCC climate reference regions for subcontinental analysis of climate model data: definition and aggregated datasets". Earth system science data. 12 (4): 2959–2970. doi:10.5194/essd-12-2959-2020. ISSN 1866-3516. Wikidata Q109936154.
