= Measurement (journal) =

- Subject: Metrology
- Language: English
- Edited by: Paolo Carbone

Publication details
- History: 1983–present
- Publisher: Elsevier
- Frequency: 18/year
- Impact factor: 5.131 (2021)

Standard abbreviations
- ISO 4: Measurement

Indexing
- ISSN: 0263-2241 (print); 1873-412X (web)
- LCCN: 2013219222
- OCLC no.: 473227924

Links
- Journal homepage; Online access; Online archive

Measurement is a peer-reviewed scientific journal covering all aspects of metrology. It was established in 1983 and is published 18 times per year. It is published by Elsevier on behalf of the International Measurement Confederation and the editor-in-chief is Paolo Carbone (University of Perugia). According to the Journal Citation Reports, the journal has a 2021 impact factor of 5.131.
