= International Measurement Confederation =

Metrological organisation

- IMEKO emblem
- Formation: 1958
- Type: INGO
- Headquarters: IMEKO Secretariat; Lajos utca 74-76, H-1031 Budapest
- Location: Hungary
- Members: 41 Member Organisations
- Official language: English
- President: Professor Paolo Carbone, Italy
- Secretary-General: Mr. Zoltan Zelenka
- Website: http://www.imeko.org/

The International Measurement Confederation (abbreviated IMEKO, from German: Internationale Meßtechnische Konföderation) is a non-governmental federation of metrological organizations. It was founded in 1958 in Budapest, Hungary.

== Structure ==
IMEKO has member organizations (MOs) in the following countries: Albania, Austria, Belgium, Bosnia and Herzegovina, Brazil, Bulgaria, Canada, China, Croatia, the Czech Republic, Finland, France, Germany, Greece, Hungary, India, Italy, Japan, Kenya, the Republic of Korea, Kosovo, Poland, Portugal, Romania, Russia, Rwanda, Serbia, Singapore, Slovakia, Slovenia, South Africa, Spain, Sweden, Switzerland, Thailand, Turkey, Uganda, Ukraine, the United Arab Emirates, the United Kingdom, and the United States of America.

IMEKO is entirely staffed by volunteers from its MOs - scientific societies or institutes of the corresponding member countries. They delegate specialists in the different fields of metrology to contribute to the work of IMEKO in the General Council, the boards and the Technical Committees (TCs). The MOs organise IMEKO events (congresses, conferences, workshops, symposia).

General Council (GC)
The General Council is the governing body, containing one or two delegates from each Member Organization. Sessions are held annually.

Technical Board (TB)
The purpose of the Technical Board is to supervise the Technical Committees. The TB is chaired by the President-Elect. The TB is responsible for creating and disbanding TCs, developing proposals for new TCs, facilitating communication with the journal Measurement, arranging sponsorship, the approval of events to be organized by the TCs, the support of the journal Editorial Board, and helping to prepare Technical Sessions and Round Tables at World Congresses.

Technical Committees (TCs)

- TC1 - Education and Training in Measurement and Instrumentation
- TC2 - Photonics
- TC3 - Measurement of Force, Mass and Torque and Gravity
- TC4 - Measurement of Electrical Quantities
- TC5 - Hardness Measurement
- TC6 - Digitalization
- TC7 - Measurement Science
- TC8 - Traceability in Metrology
- TC9 - Flow Measurement
- TC10 - Measurement for Diagnostics, Optimization & Control
- TC11 - Measurement in Testing, Inspection and Certification
- TC12 -Temperature and Thermal Measurements
- TC13 - Measurements in Biology and Medicine
- TC14 - Measurement of Geometrical Quantities
- TC15 - Experimental Mechanics
- TC16 - Pressure and Vacuum Measurement
- TC17 - Measurement in Robotics
- TC18 - Measurement of Human Functions
- TC19 - Environmental Measurements
- TC20 - Measurements of Energy and Related Quantities
- TC21 - Mathematical Tools for Measurements
- TC22 - Vibration Measurement
- TC23 - Metrology in Food and Nutrition
- TC24 - Chemical Measurements
- TC25 - Quantum Measurement and Quantum Information
- TC26 - Metrology for Cultural Heritage

== Awards ==
Traditionally, the following awards are bestowed at the closing ceremony of an IMEKO World Congress:

- Distinguished Service Award is bestowed upon persons for outstanding services to IMEKO, who have been active for many years as well-known specialists in the field of measurement.
- György Striker Junior Paper Award, a donation of the Founder and first Secretary-General of IMEKO and his wife, to be given to a junior author under 35 years of age whose paper reflects a deep understanding and knowledge of the theme of a World Congress. The sum of the award is EURO 1500.

== Publications ==
IMEKO sponsors four academic journals:

- Measurement, published by Elsevier
- Measurement: Sensors, an open access companion to Measurement, also published by Elsevier
- Measurement: Food, a new open access companion to Measurement, also published by Elsevier
- Measurement: Energy, a new open access companion to Measurement, also published by Elsevier
- Measurement: Digitalization, a new open access companion to Measurement, also published by Elsevier
- Acta IMEKO, an online-only diamond open access journal

IMEKO activities are further documented in the following publications:

- ACTA IMEKO – extended versions of selected IMEKO congresses papers
- IMEKO TC Events Series – proceedings of Technical Committee events
- IMEKO NEWSLETTER – bimonthly newsletter
- Repository of publications – proceedings of IMEKO events
- IMEKO's website

== International cooperation ==
IMEKO is one of the five Sister Federations within FIACC - Five International Associations Co-ordinating Committee, consisting of:

- International Federation of Automatic Control (IFAC)
- International Federation for Information Processing (IFIP)
- International Federation of Operational Research Societies (IFORS)
- International Association for Mathematics and Computers in Simulation (IMACS)

IMEKO also works with International Organization of Legal Metrology (OIML) and the International Bureau of Weights and Measures (BIPM), as well as the IEEE Instrumentation and Measurement Society and the IEEE Engineering in Medicine and Biology Society. The way of co-operation is organising joint events, co-sponsoring events and inviting keynote speakers to each other.
