= Variable structure control =

Variable structure control (VSC) is a form of discontinuous nonlinear control. The method alters the dynamics of a nonlinear system by application of a high-frequency switching control. The state-feedback control law is not a continuous function of time; it switches from one smooth condition to another. So the structure of the control law varies based on the position of the state trajectory; the method switches from one smooth control law to another and possibly very fast speeds (e.g., for a countably infinite number of times in a finite time interval). VSC and associated sliding mode behaviour was first investigated in early 1950s in the Soviet Union by Emelyanov and several coresearchers.

The main mode of VSC operation is sliding mode control (SMC). The strengths of SMC include:

- Low sensitivity to plant parameter uncertainty
- Greatly reduced-order modeling of plant dynamics
- Finite-time convergence (due to discontinuous control law)

The weaknesses of SMC include:

- Chattering due to implementation imperfections
- Over-focus on matched uncertainties (i.e., uncertainties that enter into the control channel)

However, the evolution of VSC is an active area of research.

== See also ==
- Variable structure system
- Sliding mode control
- Hybrid system
- Nonlinear control
- Robust control
- Optimal control
- H-bridge – A topology that combines four switches forming the four legs of an "H". Can be used to drive a motor (or other electrical device) forward or backward when only a single supply is available. Often used in actuator in sliding-mode controlled systems.
- Switching amplifier – Uses switching-mode control to drive continuous outputs
- Delta-sigma modulation – Another (feedback) method of encoding a continuous range of values in a signal that rapidly switches between two states (i.e., a kind of specialized sliding-mode control)
- Pulse-density modulation – A generalized form of delta-sigma modulation.
- Pulse-width modulation – Another modulation scheme that produces continuous motion through discontinuous switching.
