= University of Turkish Aeronautical Association =

- Türk Hava Kurumu Üniversitesi
- University logo
- Type: Foundation university
- Established: March 3, 2011
- Affiliations: Turkish Aeronautical Association Foundation
- Rector: Prof. Dr. Rahmi Er
- Location: Ankara, Turkey; 39°57′36″N 32°40′10″E
- Campus: Turkkusu
- Colours: Blue, White
- Website: thk.edu.tr

University of Turkish Aeronautical Association (UTAA) (Turkish: Türk Hava Kurumu Üniversitesi, THKÜ) is a non-profit foundation university located in Ankara, Turkey. It was established on March 3, 2011, by Law No. 6114 and is supported by the Turkish Aeronautical Association Foundation. The university is Turkey's first higher education institution specialized in aviation and space sciences.

The main aim of the university is to provide qualified human resources for the aviation and aerospace sectors, offering undergraduate and graduate education, research, and training in areas such as pilotage, air transport, aerospace sciences, and engineering.

== Academic Structure ==
=== Faculties ===
- Faculty of Air Transportation
- Faculty of Aeronautics and Astronautics
- Faculty of Business
- Faculty of Engineering
- İzmir Faculty of Air Transportation

=== Institutes ===
- Institute of Aeronautics and Space Sciences
- Institute of Science
- Institute of Social Sciences

=== Vocational Schools ===
- Ankara Aviation Vocational School
- İzmir Aviation Vocational School

== Campus and Facilities ==
The main campus is located in the Etimesgut district of Ankara, in the Turkkusu complex. The campus includes flight training fields, hangars, laboratories, flight simulators, research centers, library, student dormitories, and social facilities. Students receive hands-on training with extensive aviation infrastructure.

== Education and Graduates ==
UTAA provides applied training especially in pilotage, aviation, and space sciences. Students receive instruction at flight schools accredited by the Directorate General of Civil Aviation (SHGM) and EASA (European Union Aviation Safety Agency). Graduates are employed by Turkish Airlines, private airlines, and various aviation/aerospace companies.
