= Positive systems =

Positive systems constitute a class of systems that has the important property that its state variables are never negative, given a positive initial state. These systems appear frequently in practical applications, as these variables represent physical quantities, with positive sign (levels, heights, concentrations, etc.).

The fact that a system is positive has important implications in the control system design. For instance, an asymptotically stable positive linear time-invariant system always admits a diagonal quadratic Lyapunov function, which makes these systems more numerical tractable in the context of Lyapunov analysis.

It is also important to take this positivity into account for state observer design, as standard observers (for example Luenberger observers) might give illogical negative values.

== Conditions for positivity ==
A continuous-time linear system $\dot{x} = Ax$ is positive if and only if A is a Metzler matrix.

A discrete-time linear system $x(k+1) = A x(k)$ is positive if and only if A is a nonnegative matrix.

== See also ==
- Metzler matrix
- Nonnegative matrix
- Positive feedback
