= Hybrid system =

Dynamical system that exhibits continuous and discrete dynamic behavior

A hybrid system is a dynamical system that exhibits both continuous and discrete dynamic behavior – a system that can both flow (described by a differential equation) and jump (described by a state machine, automaton, or a difference equation). Often, the term "hybrid dynamical system" is used instead of "hybrid system", to distinguish from other usages of "hybrid system", such as the combination neural nets and fuzzy logic, or of electrical and mechanical drivelines. A hybrid system has the benefit of encompassing a larger class of systems within its structure, allowing for more flexibility in modeling dynamic phenomena.

In general, the state of a hybrid system is defined by the values of the continuous variables and a discrete mode. The state changes either continuously, according to a flow condition, or discretely according to a control graph. Continuous flow is permitted as long as so-called invariants hold, while discrete transitions can occur as soon as given jump conditions are satisfied. Discrete transitions may be associated with events.

Hybrid systems have been used to model several cyber-physical systems, including physical systems with impact, logic-dynamic controllers, and even Internet congestion.

== Hybrid systems verification ==
There are approaches to automatically proving properties of hybrid systems (e.g., some of the tools mentioned below). Common techniques for proving safety of hybrid systems are computation of reachable sets, abstraction refinement, and barrier certificates.

Most verification tasks are undecidable, making general verification algorithms impossible. Instead, the tools are analyzed for their capabilities on benchmark problems. A possible theoretical characterization of this is algorithms that succeed with hybrid systems verification in all robust cases implying that many problems for hybrid systems, while undecidable, are at least quasi-decidable.

== Other modeling approaches ==
Two basic hybrid system modeling approaches can be classified, an implicit and an explicit one. The explicit approach is often represented by a hybrid automaton, a hybrid program or a hybrid Petri net. The implicit approach is often represented by guarded equations to result in systems of differential algebraic equations (DAEs) where the active equations may change, for example by means of a hybrid bond graph.

== See also ==
- Hybrid automaton
- Sliding mode control
- Variable structure system
- Variable structure control
- Joint spectral radius
- Cyber-physical system
- Behavior trees (artificial intelligence, robotics and control)
- Jump process (in the context of probability), an example of a (stochastic) hybrid system with zero flow component
- Piecewise-deterministic Markov process (PDMP), an example of a (stochastic) hybrid system and a generalization of the jump process
- Jump diffusion, an example of a (stochastic) hybrid system and a generalization of the PDMP
