= Institute of Measurement and Control =

- InstMC logo from mid 2010s

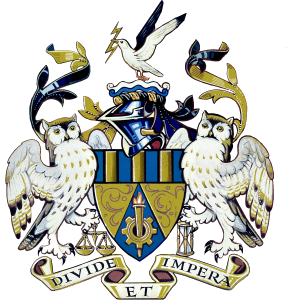
- InstMC Coat of Arms
- Abbreviation: InstMC
- Funding: By Memebership Subscription

The Institute of Measurement and Control (InstMC) is a professional organization for individuals and companies that operate within the measurement and control theory industries. It was founded in 1944 and incorporated by the Royal Charter in 1975. Its objective is to advance the science and practice of measurement and control technologies and their various applications. The institute is both a learned society and a professional qualifying body. InstMC is registered with the Engineering Council and is one of the licensed member institutions allowed to register Engineering Technician (EngTech), Incorporated Engineer (IEng) and Chartered Engineer (CEng)

The institute is the UK member body of the International Measurement Confederation (IMEKO) and is the secretariat to the United Kingdom Automatic Control Council (UKACC).

== Special Interest Groups ==
This Institute currently has a range of Special Interest Groups that organize conferences, seminars and training courses on subjects in the measurement and control fields.

Current Special Interest Groups (SIGs) include:

- Cybersecurity
- Digital Transformation
- Explosive Atmospheres
- Flow Measurement
- Functional Safety
- Measurement
- National Metrology Skills Alliance
- Standards

== Past Presidents ==
Notable former presidents of the Institute of Measurement and Control include:

- Sir George Thomson MA FRS (1944–48)
- Sir Harold Hartley GC VO FRS (1957–58)
- L. Finkelstein MSc (1980–81)
- MJH Sterling BEng Phd DEng (1988–89)
- Prof W S Bardo FREng HonFInstMC (2010–12)
- Lord Oxburgh KBE FRS Hon FREng (2012 - 2014)
- Prof Sarah Spurgeon OBE

== Affiliations ==
- International Measurement Confederation (IMEKO)
- United Kingdom Automatic Control Council (UKACC)
- National Physical Laboratory (NPL)
- Trade Association for Instrumentation, Control, Automation and Laboratory Technology (GAMBICA)
- Worshipful Company of Scientific Instrument Makers (SIM)
- British Standards Institute (BSI)
- Parliamentary and Scientific Committee

== See also ==
- Information engineering
- Control Engineering
- Instrumentation Engineering
