= Edward Routh =

English mathematician (1831–1907)

Edward Routh FRS
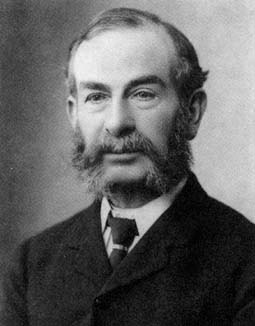
- Born: Edward John Routh; 20 January 1831; Quebec City, Lower Canada
- Died: 7 June 1907 (aged 76); Cambridge, England
- Education: University College London; Peterhouse, Cambridge
- Known for: Control theory Routh array Routh polynomials Routh's rule Routh's theorem Routhian mechanics Routh–Hurwitz matrix Routh–Hurwitz stability criterion Routh–Hurwitz theorem
- Awards: Smith's Prize (1854); Adams Prize (1872); FRS (1872)
- Scientific career
- Fields: Mathematics
- Workplaces: University of London; Peterhouse, Cambridge
- Academic advisors: William Hopkins; Augustus De Morgan; Isaac Todhunter
- Notable students: John Strutt (Rayleigh); J. J. Thomson; George Darwin; Alfred North Whitehead; Joseph Larmor; E. W. Hobson

Edward John Routh (/raʊθ/; 20 January 1831 – 7 June 1907) was an English mathematician, noted as the outstanding coach of students preparing for the Mathematical Tripos examination of the University of Cambridge in its heyday in the middle of the nineteenth century. He also did much to systematise the mathematical theory of mechanics and created several ideas critical to the development of modern control systems theory.

== Biography ==
=== Early life ===
Routh was born of an English father, Sir Randolph Isham Routh (1782–1858), and a French-Canadian mother, Marie Louise Taschereau (1810–1891), at Quebec City in the British colony of Lower Canada. His father's family could trace its history back to the Norman Conquest when it acquired land at Routh near Beverley, Yorkshire. His mother's family, the Taschereau family, was well-established in Lower Canada, tracing their ancestry back to the early days of the French colony.

Sir Randolph had been the Deputy Commissary General (senior Commissariat officer) at the Battle of Waterloo in 1815. He later was the Commissary General of the British Army (1826), Chairman of the Irish Famine Relief Commission (1845–48). Marie Louise was the daughter of Judge Jean-Thomas Taschereau and the sister of Judge Jean-Thomas and Cardinal Elzéar-Alexandre Taschereau.

Routh came to England aged eleven and attended University College School and then entered University College, London in 1847, having won a scholarship. There he studied under Augustus De Morgan, whose influence led to Routh to decide on a career in mathematics.

Routh obtained his BA (1849) and MA (1853) degrees in London. He attended Peterhouse, Cambridge, where he was taught by Isaac Todhunter and coached by "senior wrangler maker" William Hopkins. While at Peterhouse, Routh rowed for Peterhouse Boat Club. In 1854, Routh graduated just above James Clerk Maxwell, as Senior Wrangler, sharing the Smith's Prize with him. Routh was elected fellow of Peterhouse in 1856.

=== Mathematics tutor ===
On graduation, Routh took up work as a private mathematics tutor in Cambridge and took on the pupils of William John Steele during the latter's fatal illness, though insisting that Steele take the fees. Routh inherited Steele's pupils, going on to establish an unbeaten record as a coach. He coached over 600 pupils between 1855 and 1888, 28 of them making Senior wrangler, as to Hopkins' 17 with 43 of his pupils winning Smith's Prize.

Routh worked conscientiously and systematically, taking rigidly timetabled classes of ten pupils during the day and spending the evenings preparing extra material for the ablest men. "His lectures were enlivened by mathematical jokes of a rather heavy kind."

Routh was a staunch defender of the Cambridge competitive system and despaired when the university started to publish examination results in alphabetical order, observing "They will want to run the Derby alphabetically next".

=== Private life ===
Astronomer Royal George Biddell Airy sought to entice Routh to work at the Royal Observatory, Greenwich. Though Airy did not succeed, at Greenwich Routh met Airy's eldest daughter Hilda (1840–1916) whom he married in 1864. At the time, the university had a celibacy requirement, forcing Routh to vacate his fellowship and move out of Peterhouse. On the reformation of the college statutes, removing the celibacy requirement, Routh was the first person elected to an honorary fellowship by Peterhouse. The couple had five sons and a daughter. Routh was a "kindly man and a good conversationalist with friends, but with strangers he was shy and reserved."

=== Honours ===
- Fellow of the Royal Society (1872)
- Adams Prize (1877)
- Honorary membership, Manchester Literary and Philosophical Society (1889)

== Work ==
=== Mechanics ===
Routh collaborated with Henry Brougham on the Analytical View of Sir Isaac Newton's Principia (1855). He published a textbook, Dynamics of a System of Rigid Bodies (1860, 6th ed. 1897) in which he did much to define and systematise the modern mathematical approach to mechanics. This influenced Felix Klein and Arnold Sommerfeld. In fact, Klein arranged the German translation. It also did much to influence William Thomson and Peter Guthrie Tait's Treatise on Natural Philosophy (1867).

Routh noted the importance of what he called "absent coordinates," also known as cyclic coordinates or ignorable coordinates (following the terminology of E. T. Whittaker in his Analytical Dynamics of Particles and Rigid Bodies). Such coordinates are associated with conserved momenta and as such are useful in problem solving. Routh also devised a new method for solving problems in mechanics. Although Routh's procedure does not add any new insights, it allows for more systematic and convenient analysis, especially in problems with many degrees of freedom and at least some cyclic coordinates.

=== Stability and control ===
In addition to his intensive work in teaching and writing, which had a persistent effect on the presentation of mathematical physics, he also contributed original research such as the Routh–Hurwitz theorem.

Central tenets of modern control systems theory relied upon the Routh stability criterion (though nowadays due to modern computers it is not as important), an application of Sturm's theorem to evaluate Cauchy indices through the use of the Euclidean algorithm.

== Bibliography ==
- Brougham, Henry; Routh, Edward John (1855). Analytical View of Sir Isaac Newton's Principia. London: Longman, Brown, Green and Longmans.
- Routh, E. J. (1877). Treatise on the Stability of a Given State of Motion. MacMillan. Reprinted in 'Stability of Motion' (ed. A.T.Fuller) London 1975 (Taylor & Francis).
- — (1898). A Treatise on Dynamics of a Particle. With Numerous Examples. Cambridge: Cambridge University Press.
- — (1905). The Elementary Part of a Treatise on the Dynamics of a System of Rigid Bodies: Being Part I of a Treatise on the Whole Subject. With Numerous Examples.
- — (1905). The Advanced Part of a Treatise on the Dynamics of a System of Rigid Bodies: Being Part II of a Treatise on the Whole Subject. With Numerous Examples. London: Macmillan and Co. Ltd.
- — (1909a). A Treatise on Analytical Statics with Numerous Examples Volume I. Cambridge University Press.
- — (1909b). A Treatise on Analytical Statics with Numerous Examples Volume II. Cambridge University Press.
