= Hurwitz matrix =

In mathematics, two related but distinct classes of matrices are referred to as Hurwitz matrices:

- A Hurwitz-stable matrix is a matrix whose eigenvalues all have negative real part.
- The Routh–Hurwitz matrix associated to a polynomial is a particular matrix whose non-zero entries are all coefficients of the polynomial.
