= B. Ross Barmish =

American mathematician

B. Ross "Bob" Barmish
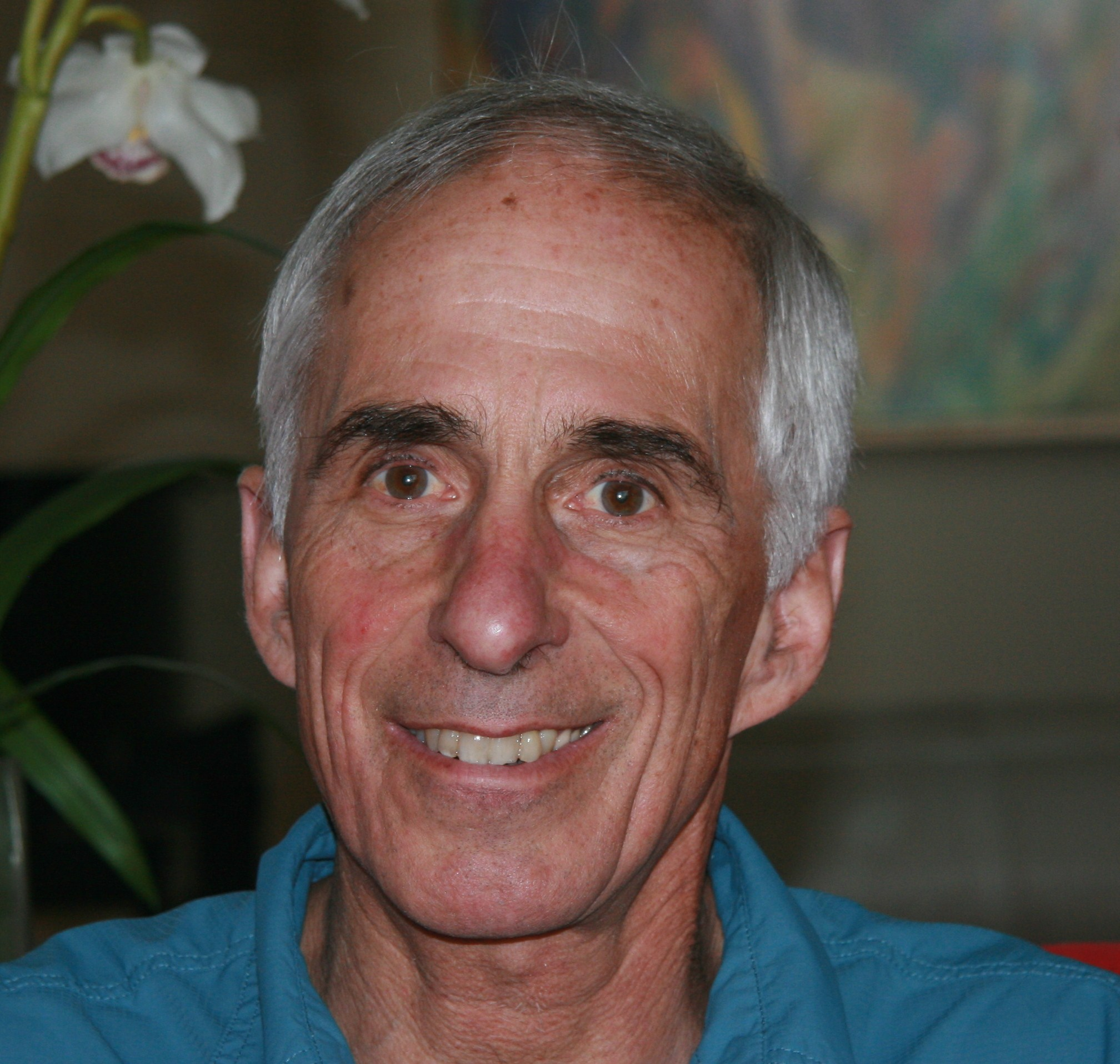
- Born: June 26, 1949 (age 77); Montreal, Canada
- Occupation: Financial engineer
- Known for: Robust control and algorithmic trading
- Spouse: Joan Marie Barmish
- Awards: Fellow of IEEE; Two consecutive IFAC Automatica 3-Year Best Paper Prizes; IEEE CSS Bode Prizes; Various National Science Foundation awards

Academic background
- Education: McGill University (1971, B.S.)
- Alma mater: Cornell University (1975, Ph.D.)
- Doctoral advisor: James Thorp

Academic work
- Institutions: University of Wisconsin–Madison, Yale University, University of Rochester, Case Western Reserve University, Boston University

B. Ross "Bob" Barmish (born June 26, 1949, Montreal) is an American-Canadian control theorist and financial engineer especially known for his work on robust control and algorithmic trading.

== Biography ==
B. Ross Barmish did his undergraduate work in Electrical Engineering (EE) at McGill University and his M.S. and Ph.D. at Cornell University, also in EE and specializing in control theory, with a minor in mathematics.

From 1975 to 1978, Barmish served as Assistant Professor of Engineering and Applied Science at Yale University, and from 1978 to 1984, he was an Associate Professor of Electrical Engineering at the University of Rochester.

In late 1984, he became Professor of Electrical and Computer Engineering (ECE) at the University of Wisconsin, where he remained until the end of 2000. During 2001 and 2002, he served as the Chair of the newly-formed Department of Electrical Engineering and Computer Science (EECS) at Case Western Reserve University while simultaneously holding the Nord Endowed Professorship. In early 2003, Barmish resumed his faculty position in Wisconsin, where he remained until his retirement and becoming Emeritus Professor at the end of 2018. Subsequently, for the three-year period covering 2019 to 2022, he held the position of Research Professor, also in ECE, at Boston University.

Barmish has been the Principal Investigator on many grants funded by U.S. National Science Foundation and other agencies. He has also worked on automotive control problems with Centro Ricerche Fiat in Italy, in partnership with a team at Politecnico di Torino, headed by Roberto Tempo. Since the start of 2020, Barmish has been living in Boxford, Massachusetts, concentrating on algorithmic trading both in academic and consulting capacities.

== Research ==
B. Ross Barmish has published more than 200 papers.

During the early 1980s, he focused on robust control issues, particularly on the so-called quadratic stablizability problem.

By the mid-1980s, after introducing Kharitonov's theorem to the robust control community, he carried out several years of research concentrating on the use of polynomials in a robust control context. This culminated with the publication of his 1994 textbook, titled New Tools for Robustness of Linear Systems.

By the late 1990s, after the publication of his paper describing the importance of the uniform distribution in robust control theory, he continued along this line of research until about 2008, at which time he moved his research emphasis into the field of algorithmic trading.

Barmish also authored a few papers in fields far from his main line of research. These include his work on consumer choice in economics, and analysis of risk versus return for contestants on the TV show The Weakest Link, work on various aspects of the sine-Gordon equation in physics, and the issue of test construction in the area of psychological measurement.

Throughout his career, Barmish has received numerous grants from the National Science Foundation (NSF). These include a research award under the NSF US-FSU Cooperative Research Program in the mid-1990s, and an NSF award titled On Building a Bridge between Classical Control Theory and Financial Markets.

== Recognition ==
Barmish holds the grade of Fellow of the Institute of Electrical and Electronics Engineers (IEEE) due to his contributions to robust control theory for systems with real parametric uncertainty. He has also been elected Fellow of the International Federation of Automatic Control (IFAC) due to his contributions to robust control theory for systems with parametric uncertainty.

Barmish received the IFAC Automatica Prize Paper Award for journal publication on two consecutive occasions. The first award, covering the period 1987-1989, was presented at the IFAC World Congress in Tallinn, Estonia, to Barmish and Shi for their work on robust stability with time delays. The second award, covering the period 1990-1992 and presented at the IFAC World Congress, at a ceremony in Australia at the Sydney Opera House, was awarded to Barmish and Tempo for their paper on the robust root locus.

During his career at the University of Wisconsin, Barmish received the College of Engineering Byron Byrd Award for Excellence in Research Publication.

In December 2012, Barmish was named by the IEEE Control Systems Society as the winner of the IEEE CSS Hendrik W. Bode Lecture Prize and was cited for fundamental contributions to the analysis of systems with parametric uncertainty and to probabilistic robustness, as well as for contributions to the design of stock-trading algorithms that are robust to market variability. In conjunction with this field award, he provided a plenary lecture at the 2013 IEEE Conference on Decision and Control in Florence, Italy, titled "Can Control Science Bring New Insights to Stock Trading Research?"

Barmish served as Program Chair for the American Control Conference in Chicago, Associate Editor for the IEEE Transactions on Automatic Control, member of the IEEE Control Systems Society Board of Governors and awards committees. Barmish is also well known for the large number of invited lectures, plenaries, and keynotes he has given, including his video presentations at ETH Zurich and the Fields Institute.

== Selected publications ==
- B. R. Barmish and G. Leitmann, "On Ultimate Boundedness Control of Uncertain Systems in the Absence of Matching Conditions," IEEE Transactions on Automatic Control, AC-27, no. 1, pp. 153-157, 1982.
- B. R. Barmish, M. Corless and G. Leitmann, "A New Class of Stabilizing Controllers for Uncertain Dynamical Systems," SIAM Journal on Control and Optimization, vol. 21, no. 2, pp. 246-255, 1983.
- B. R. Barmish, "Invariance of the Strict Hurwitz Property for Polynomials with Perturbed Coefficients," IEEE Transactions on Automatic Control, AC-29, no. 10, pp. 935936, 1984.
- B. R. Barmish, "Necessary and Sufficient Conditions for Quadratic Stabilizability of an Uncertain Linear System," Journal of Optimization Theory and Applications, vol. 46, no. 4, pp. 399-409, 1985.
- M. Fu and B. R. Barmish, "Adaptive Stabilization of Linear Systems Via Switching Control," IEEE Transactions on Automatic Control, AC-31, no. 12, pp. 1097-1103, 1986.
- B. R. Barmish, New Tools for Robustness of Linear Systems, Macmillan, 1994.
- M. Abate, B. R. Barmish, C. Murillo-Sanchez and R. Tempo, "Application of Some New Tools to Robust Stability Analysis of Spark Ignition Engines: A Case Study," IEEE Transactions on Control Systems Technology, vol. 2, no. 1, pp. 22-30, 1994.
- B. R. Barmish and C. M. Lagoa, "The Uniform Distribution: A Rigorous Justification for its Use in Robustness Analysis," Mathematics of Control Signals and Systems, vol. 10, no. 3, pp. 203-222, 1997.
- B. R. Barmish and N. Boston, "Risk and Return Considerations in the Weakest Link," American Mathematical Monthly, vol. 116, no. 4, pp. 305-315, 2009.
- B. R. Barmish and J. A. Primbs, "On a New Paradigm for Stock Trading Via a Model Free Feedback Controller," IEEE Transactions on Automatic Control, vol. AC-61, no. 3, pp. 662-676, 2016.
- S. Malekpour and B. R. Barmish, "When the Expected Value Is Not Expected: A Conservative Approach," IEEE Transactions on Systems, Man and Cybernetics: Systems, vol. 47, no. 9, pp. 2254-2466, 2017.
- C. H. Hsieh, B. R. Barmish and J. A. Gubner. "At What Frequency Should the Kelly Bettor Bet?" Proceedings of the American Control Conference (ACC), pp. 5485-5490, 2018.
- A. V. Proskurnikov and B. R. Barmish,"On the Benefit of Nonlinear Control for Robust Logarithmic Growth: Coin Flipping Games as a Demonstration Case," IEEE Control Systems Letters vol. 7, pp. 2275-2280, 2023.
