= Kharitonov region =

A Kharitonov region is a concept in mathematics. It arises in the study of the stability of polynomials.

Let $D$ be a simply-connected set in the complex plane and let $P$ be the polynomial family.

$D$ is said to be a Kharitonov region if

$$V_T^n(V_S^n)$$

is a subset of $P.$ Here, $V_T^n$ denotes the set of all vertex polynomials of complex interval polynomials $(T^n)$ and $V_S^n$ denotes the set of all vertex polynomials of real interval polynomials $(S^n).$

== See also ==
- Kharitonov's theorem
