= Stability criterion =

In control theory, and especially stability theory, a stability criterion establishes when a system is stable. A number of stability criteria are in common use:

- Circle criterion
- Jury stability criterion
- Liénard–Chipart criterion
- Nyquist stability criterion
- Routh–Hurwitz stability criterion
- Vakhitov–Kolokolov stability criterion
- Barkhausen stability criterion

Stability may also be determined by means of root locus analysis.

Although the concept of stability is general, there are several narrower definitions through which it may be assessed:

- BIBO stability
- Linear stability
- Lyapunov stability
- Orbital stability
