= Hurwitz polynomial =

Polynomial whose complex roots have non-positive real parts

In mathematics, a Hurwitz polynomial (named after German mathematician Adolf Hurwitz) is a polynomial whose roots (zeros) are located in the left half-plane of the complex plane or on the imaginary axis, that is, the real part of every root is zero or negative. Such a polynomial must have coefficients that are positive real numbers. The term is sometimes restricted to polynomials whose roots have real parts that are strictly negative, excluding the imaginary axis (i.e., a Hurwitz stable polynomial).

A polynomial function P(s) of a complex variable s is said to be Hurwitz if the following conditions are satisfied:

1. P(s) is real when s is real.
2. The roots of P(s) have real parts which are zero or negative.

Hurwitz polynomials are important in control systems theory, because they represent the characteristic equations of stable linear systems. Whether a polynomial is Hurwitz can be determined by solving the equation to find the roots, or from the coefficients without solving the equation by the Routh–Hurwitz stability criterion.

== Examples ==
A simple example of a Hurwitz polynomial is:

$$x^2 + 2x + 1.$$

The only real solution is −1, because it factors as

$$(x+1)^2.$$

In general, all quadratic polynomials with positive coefficients are Hurwitz. This follows directly from the quadratic formula:

$$x=\frac{-b\pm\sqrt{b^2-4ac\ }}{2a}.$$

where, if the discriminant b^{2}−4ac is less than zero, then the polynomial will have two complex-conjugate solutions with real part −b/2a, which is negative for positive a and b. If the discriminant is equal to zero, there will be two coinciding real solutions at −b/2a. Finally, if the discriminant is greater than zero, there will be two real negative solutions, because $\sqrt{b^2-4ac} < b$ for positive a, b and c.

== Properties ==
For a polynomial to be Hurwitz, it is necessary but not sufficient that all of its coefficients be positive (except for quadratic polynomials, which also imply sufficiency). A necessary and sufficient condition that a polynomial is Hurwitz is that it passes the Routh–Hurwitz stability criterion. A given polynomial can be efficiently tested to be Hurwitz or not by using the Routh continued fraction expansion technique.
