= Spherical pendulum =

3-Dimensional analogue of a pendulum

Spherical pendulum: angles and velocities.

In physics, a spherical pendulum is a higher dimensional analogue of the pendulum. It consists of a mass m moving without friction on the surface of a sphere. The only forces acting on the mass are the reaction from the sphere and gravity.

It is convenient to use the spherical coordinates to describe the position of the mass in terms of $(r, \theta, \phi)$, where r is fixed such that $r = l$.

== Lagrangian mechanics ==
Routinely, in order to write down the kinetic $T=\tfrac{1}{2}mv^2$ and potential $V$ parts of the Lagrangian $L=T-V$ in arbitrary generalized coordinates the position of the mass is expressed along Cartesian axes. Here, following the conventions shown in the diagram,

$$x=l\sin\theta\cos\phi$$
$$y=l\sin\theta\sin\phi$$
$$z=l(1-\cos\theta)$$.

Next, time derivatives of these coordinates are taken, to obtain velocities along the axes

$$\dot x=l\cos\theta\cos\phi\,\dot\theta-l\sin\theta\sin\phi\,\dot\phi$$
$$\dot y=l\cos\theta\sin\phi\,\dot\theta+l\sin\theta\cos\phi\,\dot\phi$$
$$\dot z=l\sin\theta\,\dot\theta$$.

Thus,

$$v^2=\dot x ^2+\dot y ^2+\dot z ^2
=l^2\left(\dot\theta ^2+\sin^2\theta\,\dot\phi ^2\right)$$

and

$$T=\tfrac{1}{2}mv^2
=\tfrac{1}{2}ml^2\left(\dot\theta ^2+\sin^2\theta\,\dot\phi ^2\right)$$
$$V=mg\,z=mg\,l(1-\cos\theta)$$

The Lagrangian, with constant parts removed, is

$$L=\frac{1}{2}
ml^2\left(
\dot{\theta}^2+\sin^2\theta\ \dot{\phi}^2
\right)
+ mgl\cos\theta.$$

The Euler–Lagrange equation involving the polar angle $\theta$

$$\frac{d}{dt}\frac{\partial}{\partial\dot\theta}L-\frac{\partial}{\partial\theta}L=0$$

gives

$$\frac{d}{dt}
\left(ml^2\dot{\theta}
\right)
-ml^2\sin\theta\cdot\cos\theta\,\dot{\phi}^2+
mgl\sin\theta =0$$

and

$$\ddot\theta=\sin\theta\cos\theta\dot\phi ^2-\frac{g}{l}\sin\theta$$

When $\dot\phi=0$ the equation reduces to the differential equation for the motion of a simple gravity pendulum.

Similarly, the Euler–Lagrange equation involving the azimuth $\phi$,

$$\frac{d}{dt}\frac{\partial}{\partial\dot\phi}L-\frac{\partial}{\partial\phi}L=0$$

gives

$$\frac{d}{dt}
\left(
ml^2\sin^2\theta
\cdot
\dot{\phi}
\right)
=0$$.

The last equation shows that angular momentum around the vertical axis, $|\mathbf L_z| = l\sin\theta \times ml\sin\theta\,\dot\phi$ is conserved. The factor $ml^2\sin^2\theta$ will play a role in the Hamiltonian formulation below.

The second order differential equation determining the evolution of $\phi$ is thus

$$\ddot\phi\,\sin\theta = -2\,\dot\theta\,\dot{\phi}\,\cos\theta$$.

The azimuth $\phi$, being absent from the Lagrangian, is a cyclic coordinate, which implies that its conjugate momentum is a constant of motion.

The conical pendulum refers to the special solutions where $\dot\theta=0$ and $\dot\phi$ is a constant not depending on time.

== Hamiltonian mechanics ==
The Hamiltonian is

$$H=P_\theta\dot \theta + P_\phi\dot \phi-L$$

where conjugate momenta are

$$P_\theta=\frac{\partial L}{\partial \dot \theta}=ml^2\cdot \dot \theta$$

and

$$P_\phi=\frac{\partial L}{\partial \dot \phi} = ml^2 \sin^2\! \theta \cdot \dot \phi$$.

In terms of coordinates and momenta it reads

$$H = \underbrace{\left[\frac{1}{2}ml^2\dot\theta^2 + \frac{1}{2}ml^2\sin^2\theta\dot \phi^2\right]}_{T} + \underbrace{ \bigg[-mgl\cos\theta\bigg]}_{V}=
{P_\theta^2\over 2ml^2}+{P_\phi^2\over 2ml^2\sin^2\theta}-mgl\cos\theta$$

Hamilton's equations will give time evolution of coordinates and momenta in four first-order differential equations

$$\dot {\theta}={P_\theta \over ml^2}$$
$$\dot {\phi}={P_\phi \over ml^2\sin^2\theta}$$
$$\dot {P_\theta}={P_\phi^2\over ml^2\sin^3\theta}\cos\theta-mgl\sin\theta$$
$$\dot {P_\phi}=0$$

Momentum $P_\phi$ is a constant of motion. That is a consequence of the rotational symmetry of the system around the vertical axis.

== Trajectory ==
Trajectory of a spherical pendulum.

Trajectory of the mass on the sphere can be obtained from the expression for the total energy

$$E=\underbrace{\left[\frac{1}{2}ml^2\dot\theta^2 + \frac{1}{2}ml^2\sin^2\theta \dot \phi^2\right]}_{T}+\underbrace{ \bigg[-mgl\cos\theta\bigg]}_{V}$$

by noting that the vertical component of angular momentum $L_z = ml^2\sin^2\!\theta \,\dot\phi$ is a constant of motion, independent of time. This is true because neither gravity nor the reaction from the sphere act in directions that would affect this component of angular momentum.

Hence

$$E=\frac{1}{2}ml^2\dot\theta^2 + \frac{1}{2}\frac{L_z^2}{ml^2\sin^2\theta}-mgl\cos\theta$$
$$\left(\frac{d\theta}{dt}\right)^2=\frac{2}{ml^2}\left[E-\frac{1}{2}\frac{L_z^2}{ml^2\sin^2\theta}+mgl\cos\theta\right]$$

which leads to an elliptic integral of the first kind for $\theta$

$$t(\theta)=\sqrt{\tfrac{1}{2}ml^2}\int\left[E-\frac{1}{2}\frac{L_z^2}{ml^2\sin^2\theta}+mgl\cos\theta\right]^{-\frac{1}{2}}\,d\theta$$

and an elliptic integral of the third kind for $\phi$

$$\phi(\theta)=\frac{L_z}{l\sqrt{2m}}\int\sin^{-2}\theta \left[E-\frac{1}{2}\frac{L_z^2}{ml^2\sin^2\theta}+mgl\cos\theta\right]^{-\frac{1}{2}}\,d\theta$$.

The angle $\theta$ lies between two circles of latitude, where

$$E>\frac{1}{2}\frac{L_z^2}{ml^2\sin^2\theta}-mgl\cos\theta$$.

== See also ==
- Foucault pendulum
- Conical pendulum
- Newton's three laws of motion
- Pendulum
- Pendulum (mathematics)
- Routhian mechanics
