= Hyperstability =

In stability theory, hyperstability is a property of a system that requires the state vector to remain bounded if the inputs are restricted to belonging to a subset of the set of all possible inputs.

Definition: A system is hyperstable if there are two constants $k_1 \ge 0, k_2 \ge 0$ such that any state trajectory of the system satisfies the inequality:

$$\| x(t) \| < k_1 \|x(0)\| + k_2, \, \forall t \ge 0$$

== See also ==
- Stability theory
- BIBO stability
