= Alfred-Marie Liénard =

French physicist and engineer

- Born: Alfred-Marie Liénard; 2 April 1869; Amiens, France
- Died: 29 April 1958 (aged 89); Paris, France
- Known for: Liénard equation Liénard–Chipart criterion Liénard–Wiechert potential
- Awards: Poncelet Prize (1929)
- Scientific career
- Workplaces: École des Mines de Saint-Étienne

Alfred-Marie Liénard (2 April 1869 in Amiens – 29 April 1958 in Paris), was a French physicist and engineer. He is best known for his derivation of the Liénard–Wiechert potentials.

From 1887 to 1889 Liénard was a student at the École Polytechnique and from 1889 to 1892 at the École des mines de Paris. From 1892 to 1895 he was a mining engineer in Valencia, Marseille, and Angers. From 1895 to 1908 he was professor at the École des Mines de Saint-Étienne and from 1908 to 1911 he was professor of electrical engineering at the École des Mines de Paris. In World War I he served in the French Army.

Liénard worked in the fields of electricity, magnetism, and mechanics. In 1898 (and two years after him Emil Wiechert), he derived what is now called the Liénard–Wiechert potentials. He also investigated problems related to the elasticity and strength of materials, and wrote papers on thermodynamics and hydrodynamics.

Along with M. H. Chipart, Liénard developed the Liénard–Chipart criterion for determining the stability of a continuous-time system of equations.

Liénard was a commander of the Légion d'honneur. He was also vice-president of the Société Française des Électriciens and president of the Société Mathématique de France.

== See also ==
- Self-oscillation
