= Routhian mechanics =

Formulation of classical mechanics

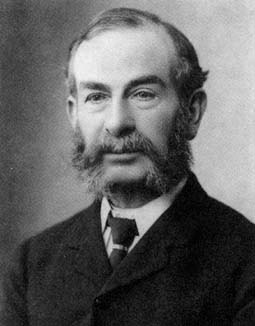
Edward John Routh, 1831–1907

In classical mechanics, Routh's procedure or Routhian mechanics is a hybrid formulation of Lagrangian mechanics and Hamiltonian mechanics developed by Edward John Routh, who formulated it about 1860. Correspondingly, the Routhian is the function which replaces both the Lagrangian and Hamiltonian functions. Although Routhian mechanics is equivalent to Lagrangian mechanics and Hamiltonian mechanics, and introduces no new physics, it offers an alternative way to solve mechanical problems.

== Definitions ==
The Routhian, like the Hamiltonian, can be obtained from a Legendre transform of the Lagrangian, and has a similar mathematical form to the Hamiltonian, but is not exactly the same. The difference between the Lagrangian, Hamiltonian, and Routhian functions are their variables. For a given set of generalized coordinates representing the degrees of freedom in the system, the Lagrangian is a function of the coordinates and velocities, while the Hamiltonian is a function of the coordinates and momenta.

The Routhian differs from these functions in that some coordinates are chosen to have corresponding generalized velocities, the rest to have corresponding generalized momenta. This choice is arbitrary, and can be done to simplify the problem. It also has the consequence that the Routhian equations are exactly the Hamiltonian equations for some coordinates and corresponding momenta, and the Lagrangian equations for the rest of the coordinates and their velocities. In each case the Lagrangian and Hamiltonian functions are replaced by a single function, the Routhian. The full set thus has the advantages of both sets of equations, with the convenience of splitting one set of coordinates to the Hamilton equations, and the rest to the Lagrangian equations.

In the case of Lagrangian mechanics, the generalized coordinates q_{1}, q_{2}, ... and the corresponding velocities dq_{1}/dt, dq_{2}/dt, ..., and possibly time (Note: The coordinates are functions of time, so the Lagrangian always has implicit time-dependence via the coordinates. If the Lagrangian changes with time irrespective of the coordinates, usually due to some time-dependent potential, then the Lagrangian is said to have "explicit" time-dependence. Similarly for the Hamiltonian and Routhian functions.) t, enter the Lagrangian,

$$L(q_1,q_2,\ldots,\dot{q}_1,\dot{q}_2,\ldots,t)\,, \quad \dot{q}_i = \frac{d q_i}{dt} \,,$$

where the overdots denote time derivatives.

In Hamiltonian mechanics, the generalized coordinates q_{1}, q_{2}, ... and the corresponding generalized momenta p_{1}, p_{2}, ..., and possibly time, enter the Hamiltonian,

$$H(q_1,q_2,\ldots,p_1,p_2,\ldots,t) = \sum_i \dot{q}_ip_i - L(q_1,q_2,\ldots,\dot{q}_1(p_1),\dot{q}_2(p_2),\ldots,t) \,, \quad p_i = \frac{\partial L}{\partial \dot{q}_i}\,,$$

where the second equation is the definition of the generalized momentum p_{i} corresponding to the coordinate q_{i} (partial derivatives are denoted using ∂). The velocities dq_{i}/dt are expressed as functions of their corresponding momenta by inverting their defining relation. In this context, p_{i} is said to be the momentum "canonically conjugate" to q_{i}.

The Routhian is intermediate between L and H; some coordinates q_{1}, q_{2}, ..., q_{n} are chosen to have corresponding generalized momenta p_{1}, p_{2}, ..., p_{n}, the rest of the coordinates ζ_{1}, ζ_{2}, ..., ζ_{s} to have generalized velocities dζ_{1}/dt, dζ_{2}/dt, ..., dζ_{s}/dt, and time may appear explicitly;

Routhian (n + s degrees of freedom)

$R(q_1,\ldots,q_n,\zeta_1,\ldots,\zeta_s, p_1, \ldots,p_n , \dot{\zeta}_1 , \ldots,\dot{\zeta}_s,t) = \sum_{i=1}^n p_i\dot{q}_i(p_i) - L(q_1,\ldots,q_n,\zeta_1,\ldots,\zeta_s, \dot{q}_1(p_1), \ldots, \dot{q}_n(p_n) , \dot{\zeta}_1 , \ldots,\dot{\zeta}_s,t) \,,$

where again the generalized velocity dq_{i}/dt is to be expressed as a function of generalized momentum p_{i} via its defining relation. The choice of which n coordinates are to have corresponding momenta, out of the n + s coordinates, is arbitrary.

The above is used by Landau and Lifshitz, and Goldstein. Some authors may define the Routhian to be the negative of the above definition.

Given the length of the general definition, a more compact notation is to use boldface for tuples (or vectors) of the variables, thus q = (q_{1}, q_{2}, ..., q_{n}), ζ = (ζ_{1}, ζ_{2}, ..., ζ_{s}), p = (p_{1}, p_{2}, ..., p_{n}), and d ζ/dt = (dζ_{1}/dt, dζ_{2}/dt, ..., dζ_{s}/dt), so that

$$R(\mathbf{q},\boldsymbol{\zeta}, \mathbf{p}, \dot{\boldsymbol{\zeta}}, t) = \mathbf{p}\cdot\dot{{\mathbf{q}}} - L(\mathbf{q}, \boldsymbol{\zeta}, \dot{\mathbf{q}}, \dot{\boldsymbol{\zeta}},t) \,,$$

where · is the dot product defined on the tuples, for the specific example appearing here:

$$\mathbf{p}\cdot\dot{{\mathbf{q}}} = \sum_{i=1}^n p_i\dot{q}_i \,.$$

== Equations of motion ==
For reference, the Euler–Lagrange equations for s degrees of freedom are a set of s coupled second order ordinary differential equations in the coordinates

$$\frac{d}{dt}\frac{\partial L}{\partial \dot{q}_j} = \frac{\partial L}{\partial q_j} \,,$$

where j = 1, 2, ..., s, and the Hamiltonian equations for n degrees of freedom are a set of 2n coupled first order ordinary differential equations in the coordinates and momenta

$$\dot{q}_i = \frac{\partial H}{\partial p_i} \,,\quad \dot{p}_i = -\frac{\partial H}{\partial q_i} \,.$$

Below, the Routhian equations of motion are obtained in two ways, in the process other useful derivatives are found that can be used elsewhere.

=== Two degrees of freedom ===
Consider the case of a system with two degrees of freedom, q and ζ, with generalized velocities dq/dt and dζ/dt, and the Lagrangian is time-dependent. (The generalization to any number of degrees of freedom follows exactly the same procedure as with two). The Lagrangian of the system will have the form

$$L(q, \zeta, \dot{q}, \dot{\zeta}, t)$$

The differential of L is

$$dL = \frac{\partial L}{\partial q}dq + \frac{\partial L}{\partial \zeta}d\zeta + \frac{\partial L}{\partial \dot{q}}d\dot{q} + \frac{\partial L}{\partial \dot{\zeta}}d\dot{\zeta} + \frac{\partial L}{\partial t}dt \,.$$

Now change variables, from the set (q, ζ, dq/dt, dζ/dt) to (q, ζ, p, dζ/dt), simply switching the velocity dq/dt to the momentum p. This change of variables in the differentials is the Legendre transformation. The differential of the new function to replace L will be a sum of differentials in dq, dζ, dp, d(dζ/dt), and dt. Using the definition of generalized momentum and Lagrange's equation for the coordinate q:

$$p = \frac{\partial L}{\partial \dot{q}} \,,\quad  \dot{p} = \frac{d}{dt}\frac{\partial L}{\partial \dot{q}} = \frac{\partial L}{\partial q}$$

we have

$$dL = \dot{p}dq + \frac{\partial L}{\partial \zeta}d\zeta + p d\dot{q} + \frac{\partial L}{\partial \dot{\zeta}}d\dot{\zeta} + \frac{\partial L}{\partial t}dt$$

and to replace pd(dq/dt) by (dq/dt)dp, recall the product rule for differentials, (Note: For two functions u and v, the differential of the product is d(uv) = udv + vdu.) and substitute

$$pd\dot{q} = d(\dot{q} p) - \dot{q}dp$$

to obtain the differential of a new function in terms of the new set of variables:

$$d(L-p\dot{q}) = \dot{p} dq + \frac{\partial L}{\partial \zeta}d\zeta  - \dot{q} dp + \frac{\partial L}{\partial \dot{\zeta}}d\dot{\zeta} + \frac{\partial L}{\partial t}dt \,.$$

Introducing the Routhian

$$R(q,\zeta,p,\dot{\zeta},t) = p \dot{q}(p) - L$$

where again the velocity dq/dt is a function of the momentum p, we have

$$dR = -\dot{p} dq - \frac{\partial L}{\partial \zeta}d\zeta  + \dot{q}dp - \frac{\partial L}{\partial \dot{\zeta}}d\dot{\zeta} - \frac{\partial L}{\partial t}dt\,,$$

but from the above definition, the differential of the Routhian is

$$dR = \frac{\partial R }{\partial q}dq + \frac{\partial R }{\partial \zeta}d\zeta + \frac{\partial R }{\partial p}dp + \frac{\partial R }{\partial \dot{\zeta}}d\dot{\zeta} + \frac{\partial R}{\partial t}dt \,.$$

Comparing the coefficients of the differentials dq, dζ, dp, d(dζ/dt), and dt, the results are Hamilton's equations for the coordinate q,

$$\dot{q} = \frac{\partial R}{\partial p} \,,\quad \dot{p} = -\frac{\partial R}{\partial q} \,,$$

and Lagrange's equation for the coordinate ζ

$$\frac{d}{dt}\frac{\partial R}{\partial \dot{\zeta}} = \frac{\partial R}{\partial \zeta}$$

which follow from

$$\frac{\partial L}{\partial \zeta} = - \frac{\partial R}{\partial \zeta} \,,\quad \frac{\partial L}{\partial \dot{\zeta}} = - \frac{\partial R}{\partial \dot{\zeta}} \,,$$

and taking the total time derivative of the second equation and equating to the first. Notice the Routhian replaces the Hamiltonian and Lagrangian functions in all the equations of motion.

The remaining equation states the partial time derivatives of L and R are negatives

$$\frac{\partial L}{\partial t}=-\frac{\partial R}{\partial t}\,.$$

=== Any number of degrees of freedom ===
For n + s coordinates as defined above, with Routhian

$$R(q_1,\ldots,q_n,\zeta_1,\ldots,\zeta_s, p_1, \ldots,p_n , \dot{\zeta}_1 , \ldots,\dot{\zeta}_s,t) = \sum_{i=1}^n p_i\dot{q}_i(p_i) - L$$

the equations of motion can be derived by a Legendre transformation of this Routhian as in the previous section, but another way is to simply take the partial derivatives of R with respect to the coordinates q_{i} and ζ_{j}, momenta p_{i}, and velocities dζ_{j}/dt, where i = 1, 2, ..., n, and j = 1, 2, ..., s. The derivatives are

$$\frac{\partial R}{\partial q_i} = -\frac{\partial L}{\partial q_i} = - \frac{d}{dt}\frac{\partial L}{\partial \dot{q}_i} = - \dot{p}_i$$

$$\frac{\partial R}{\partial p_i} = \dot{q}_i$$

$$\frac{\partial R}{\partial \zeta_j} = - \frac{\partial L}{\partial \zeta_j} \,,$$

$$\frac{\partial R}{\partial \dot{\zeta}_j} = - \frac{\partial L}{\partial \dot{\zeta}_j} \,,$$

$$\frac{\partial R}{\partial t} = - \frac{\partial L}{\partial t} \,.$$

The first two are identically the Hamiltonian equations. Equating the total time derivative of the fourth set of equations with the third (for each value of j) gives the Lagrangian equations. The fifth is just the same relation between time partial derivatives as before. To summarize

Routhian equations of motion (n + s degrees of freedom)

$\dot{q}_i = \frac{\partial R}{\partial p_i} \,,\quad \dot{p}_i = -\frac{\partial R}{\partial q_i} \,,$

$\frac{d}{dt}\frac{\partial R}{\partial \dot{\zeta}_j} = \frac{\partial R}{\partial \zeta_j} \,.$

The total number of equations is 2n + s, there are 2n Hamiltonian equations plus s Lagrange equations.

== Energy ==
Since the Lagrangian has the same units as energy, the units of the Routhian are also energy. In SI units this is the Joule.

Taking the total time derivative of the Lagrangian leads to the general result

$$-\frac{\partial L}{\partial t} = \frac{d }{d t}\left(\sum_{i=1}^n \dot{q}_i\frac{\partial L}{\partial \dot{q}_i} + \sum_{j=1}^s \dot{\zeta}_j\frac{\partial L}{\partial \dot{\zeta}_j} - L\right)\,.$$

If the Lagrangian is independent of time, the partial time derivative of the Lagrangian is zero, ∂L/∂t = 0, so the quantity under the total time derivative in brackets must be a constant, it is the total energy of the system

$$E = \sum_{i=1}^n \dot{q}_i\frac{\partial L}{\partial \dot{q}_i} + \sum_{j=1}^s \dot{\zeta}_j\frac{\partial L}{\partial \dot{\zeta}_j} - L\,.$$

(If there are external fields interacting with the constituents of the system, they can vary throughout space but not time). This expression requires the partial derivatives of L with respect to all the velocities dq_{i}/dt and dζ_{j}/dt. Under the same condition of R being time independent, the energy in terms of the Routhian is a little simpler, substituting the definition of R and the partial derivatives of R with respect to the velocities dζ_{j}/dt,

$$E = R - \sum_{j=1}^s \dot{\zeta}_j\frac{\partial R}{\partial \dot{\zeta}_j} \,.$$

Notice only the partial derivatives of R with respect to the velocities dζ_{j}/dt are needed. In the case that s = 0 and the Routhian is explicitly time-independent, then E = R, that is, the Routhian equals the energy of the system. The same expression for R in when s = 0 is also the Hamiltonian, so in all E = R = H.

If the Routhian has explicit time dependence, the total energy of the system is not constant. The general result is

$$\frac{\partial R}{\partial t} = \dfrac{d}{dt}\left(R - \sum_{j=1}^s \dot{\zeta}_j\frac{\partial R}{\partial \dot{\zeta}_j} \right)\,,$$

which can be derived from the total time derivative of R in the same way as for L.

== Cyclic coordinates ==
Often the Routhian approach may offer no advantage, but one notable case where this is useful is when a system has cyclic coordinates (also called "ignorable coordinates"), by definition those coordinates which do not appear in the original Lagrangian. The Lagrangian equations are powerful results, used frequently in theory and practice, since the equations of motion in the coordinates are easy to set up. However, if cyclic coordinates occur there will still be equations to solve for all the coordinates, including the cyclic coordinates despite their absence in the Lagrangian. The Hamiltonian equations are useful theoretical results, but less useful in practice because coordinates and momenta are related together in the solutions - after solving the equations the coordinates and momenta must be eliminated from each other. Nevertheless, the Hamiltonian equations are perfectly suited to cyclic coordinates because the equations in the cyclic coordinates trivially vanish, leaving only the equations in the non cyclic coordinates.

The Routhian approach has the best of both approaches, because cyclic coordinates can be split off to the Hamiltonian equations and eliminated, leaving behind the non cyclic coordinates to be solved from the Lagrangian equations. Overall fewer equations need to be solved compared to the Lagrangian approach.

The Routhian formulation is useful for systems with cyclic coordinates, because by definition those coordinates do not enter L, and hence R. The corresponding partial derivatives of L and R with respect to those coordinates are zero, which equates to the corresponding generalized momenta reducing to constants. To make this concrete, if the q_{i} are all cyclic coordinates, and the ζ_{j} are all non cyclic, then

$$\frac{\partial L}{\partial q_i}  = \dot{p}_i = - \frac{\partial R}{\partial q_i} = 0 \quad \Rightarrow \quad p_i = \alpha_i \,,$$

where the α_{i} are constants. With these constants substituted into the Routhian, R is a function of only the non cyclic coordinates and velocities (and in general time also)

$$R(\zeta_1,\ldots,\zeta_s,\alpha_1,\ldots,\alpha_n,\dot{\zeta}_1,\ldots,\dot{\zeta}_s,t) = \sum_{i=1}^n \alpha_i\dot{q}_i(\alpha_i) - L(\zeta_1,\ldots,\zeta_s,\dot{q}_1(\alpha_1),\ldots,\dot{q}_n(\alpha_n),\dot{\zeta}_1,\ldots,\dot{\zeta}_s,t) \,,$$

The 2n Hamiltonian equation in the cyclic coordinates automatically vanishes,

$$\dot{q}_i=\frac{\partial R}{\partial \alpha_i}=f_i( \zeta_1(t),\ldots,\zeta_s(t), \dot{\zeta}_1(t),\ldots,\dot{\zeta}_s(t), \alpha_1,\ldots,\alpha_n,t) \,,\quad \dot{p}_i=-\frac{\partial R}{\partial q_i}=0\,,$$

and the s Lagrangian equations are in the non cyclic coordinates

$$\frac{d}{dt}\frac{\partial R}{\partial \dot{\zeta}_j} = \frac{\partial R}{\partial \zeta_j} \,.$$

Thus the problem has been reduced to solving the Lagrangian equations in the non cyclic coordinates, with the advantage of the Hamiltonian equations cleanly removing the cyclic coordinates. Using those solutions, the equations for $\dot{q}_i$can be integrated to compute $q_i(t)$.

If we are interested in how the cyclic coordinates change with time, the equations for the generalized velocities corresponding to the cyclic coordinates can be integrated.

== Examples ==
Routh's procedure does not guarantee the equations of motion will be simple, however it will lead to fewer equations.

=== Central potential in spherical coordinates ===
One general class of mechanical systems with cyclic coordinates are those with central potentials, because potentials of this form only have dependence on radial separations and no dependence on angles.

Consider a particle of mass m under the influence of a central potential V(r) in spherical polar coordinates (r, θ, φ)

$$L(r,\dot{r},\theta,\dot{\theta},\dot{\phi}) = \frac{m}{2}(\dot{r}^2 + {r}^2\dot{\theta}^2 + r^2 \sin^2\theta\dot{\varphi}^2) - V(r) \,.$$

Notice φ is cyclic, because it does not appear in the Lagrangian. The momentum conjugate to φ is the constant

$$p_\phi = \frac{\partial L}{\partial \dot{\phi}} = mr^2\sin^2\theta\dot{\phi}\,,$$

in which r and dφ/dt can vary with time, but the angular momentum p_{φ} is constant. The Routhian can be taken to be

$$\begin{align}
R(r,\dot{r},\theta,\dot{\theta}) & = p_\phi\dot{\phi} - L \\
& = p_\phi\dot{\phi} - \frac{m}{2}\dot{r}^2 - \frac{m}{2}r^2\dot{\theta}^2 - \frac{p_\phi\dot{\phi}}{2} + V(r) \\
& = \frac{p_\phi\dot{\phi}}{2} - \frac{m}{2}\dot{r}^2 - \frac{m}{2}r^2\dot{\theta}^2 + V(r) \\
& = \frac{p_\phi^2 }{2mr^2\sin^2\theta} - \frac{m}{2}\dot{r}^2 - \frac{m}{2}r^2\dot{\theta}^2 + V(r) \,.
\end{align}$$

We can solve for r and θ using Lagrange's equations, and do not need to solve for φ since it is eliminated by Hamiltonian's equations. The r equation is

$$\frac{d}{dt} \frac{\partial R}{\partial \dot{r}} = \frac{\partial R}{\partial r} \quad\Rightarrow\quad-m\ddot{r} = -\frac{p_\phi^2}{mr^3\sin^2\theta} - mr\dot{\theta}^2 + \frac{\partial V}{\partial r} \,,$$

and the θ equation is

$$\frac{d}{dt} \frac{\partial R}{\partial \dot{\theta}} = \frac{\partial R}{\partial \theta} \quad\Rightarrow\quad -m(2r\dot{r}\dot{\theta} + r^2\ddot{\theta}) = -\frac{p_\phi^2\cos\theta}{mr^2\sin^3\theta} \,.$$

The Routhian approach has obtained two coupled nonlinear equations. By contrast the Lagrangian approach leads to three nonlinear coupled equations, mixing in the first and second time derivatives of φ in all of them, despite its absence from the Lagrangian.

The r equation is

$$\frac{d}{dt} \frac{\partial L}{\partial \dot{r}} = \frac{\partial L}{\partial r} \quad\Rightarrow\quad m\ddot{r} = mr\dot{\theta}^2 + mr\sin^2\theta\dot{\phi}^2 - \frac{\partial V}{\partial r} \,,$$

the θ equation is

$$\frac{d}{dt} \frac{\partial L}{\partial \dot{\theta}} = \frac{\partial L}{\partial \theta} \quad\Rightarrow\quad 2r\dot{r}\dot{\theta} + r^2\ddot{\theta} = r^2 \sin\theta\cos\theta\dot{\phi}^2\,,$$

the φ equation is

$$\frac{d}{dt} \frac{\partial L}{\partial \dot{\phi}} = \frac{\partial L}{\partial \phi} \quad\Rightarrow\quad 2r\dot{r}\sin^2\theta\dot{\phi} + 2r^2 \sin\theta\cos\theta \dot{\theta}\dot{\phi} + r^2\sin^2\theta \ddot{\phi}=0 \,.$$

=== Symmetric mechanical systems ===
==== Spherical pendulum ====
Spherical pendulum: angles and velocities

Consider the spherical pendulum, a mass m (known as a "pendulum bob") attached to a rigid rod of length l of negligible mass, subject to a local gravitational field g. The system rotates with angular velocity dφ/dt which is not constant. The angle between the rod and vertical is θ and is not constant.

The Lagrangian is (Note: The potential energy is actually $$V=mg\ell(1-\cos\theta)\,,$$ but since the first term is constant, it can be ignored in the Lagrangian (and Routhian) which only depend on derivatives of coordinates and velocities. Subtracting this from the kinetic energy means a plus sign in the Lagrangian, not minus.)

$$L(\theta,\dot{\theta},\dot{\phi}) = \frac{m\ell^2}{2}(\dot{\theta}^2 + \sin^2\theta \dot{\phi}^2) + mg\ell\cos\theta \,,$$

and φ is the cyclic coordinate for the system with constant momentum

$$p_\phi = \frac{\partial L}{\partial \dot{\phi}} = m\ell^2\sin^2\theta \dot{\phi} \,.$$

which again is physically the angular momentum of the system about the vertical. The angle θ and angular velocity dφ/dt vary with time, but the angular momentum is constant. The Routhian is

$$\begin{align}
R(\theta,\dot{\theta}) & = p_\phi \dot{\phi} - L \\
& = p_\phi \dot{\phi} - \frac{m\ell^2}{2}\dot{\theta}^2 - \frac{p_\phi \dot{\phi}}{2} - mg\ell\cos\theta \\
& = \frac{p_\phi \dot{\phi}}{2} - \frac{m\ell^2}{2}\dot{\theta}^2  - mg\ell\cos\theta \\
& = \frac{p_\phi^2 }{2m\ell^2\sin^2\theta} - \frac{m\ell^2}{2}\dot{\theta}^2 - mg\ell\cos\theta
\end{align}$$

The θ equation is found from the Lagrangian equations

$$\frac{d}{dt}\frac{\partial R}{\partial \dot{\theta}} = \frac{\partial R}{\partial \theta} \quad \Rightarrow \quad - m\ell^2\ddot{\theta} = -\frac{p_\phi^2 \cos\theta}{m\ell^2\sin^3\theta} + mg\ell\sin\theta \,,$$

or simplifying by introducing the constants

$$a = \frac{p_\phi^2}{m^2\ell^4}\,,\quad b = \frac{g}{\ell} \,,$$

gives

$$\ddot{\theta} = a\frac{\cos\theta}{\sin^3\theta} - b \sin\theta \,.$$

This equation resembles the simple nonlinear pendulum equation, because it can swing through the vertical axis, with an additional term to account for the rotation about the vertical axis (the constant a is related to the angular momentum p_{φ}).

Applying the Lagrangian approach there are two nonlinear coupled equations to solve.

The θ equation is

$$\frac{d}{dt} \frac{\partial L}{\partial \dot{\theta}} = \frac{\partial L}{\partial \theta} \quad\Rightarrow\quad m\ell^2\ddot{\theta} = m\ell^2 \sin\theta\cos\theta\dot{\phi}^2 -mg\ell\sin\theta \,,$$

and the φ equation is

$$\frac{d}{dt} \frac{\partial L}{\partial \dot{\phi}} = \frac{\partial L}{\partial \phi} \quad\Rightarrow\quad 2\sin\theta\cos\theta \dot{\theta}\dot{\phi} + \sin^2\theta \ddot{\phi}=0 \,.$$

==== Heavy symmetrical top ====
Heavy symmetric top in terms of the Euler angles

The heavy symmetrical top of mass M has Lagrangian

$$L(\theta,\dot{\theta},\dot{\psi},\dot{\phi})=\frac{I_1}{2}(\dot{\theta}^2 + \dot{\phi}^2\sin^2\theta) + \frac{I_3}{2}(\dot{\psi}^2+\dot{\phi}^2\cos^2\theta)+I_3\dot{\psi}\dot{\phi}\cos\theta-Mg\ell\cos\theta$$

where ψ, φ, θ are the Euler angles, θ is the angle between the vertical z-axis and the top's z′-axis, ψ is the rotation of the top about its own z′-axis, and φ the azimuthal of the top's z′-axis around the vertical z-axis. The principal moments of inertia are I_{1} about the top's own x′ axis, I_{2} about the top's own y′ axes, and I_{3} about the top's own z′-axis. Since the top is symmetric about its z′-axis, I_{1} = I_{2}. Here the simple relation for local gravitational potential energy V = Mglcosθ is used where g is the acceleration due to gravity, and the centre of mass of the top is a distance l from its tip along its z′-axis.

The angles ψ, φ are cyclic. The constant momenta are the angular momenta of the top about its axis and its precession about the vertical, respectively:

$$p_\psi = \frac{\partial L}{\partial \dot{\psi}} = I_3\dot{\psi} + I_3\dot{\phi} \cos\theta$$
$$p_\phi = \frac{\partial L}{\partial \dot{\phi}} = \dot{\phi}(I_1\sin^2\theta + I_3\cos^2\theta) + I_3\dot{\psi}\cos\theta$$

From these, eliminating dψ/dt:

$$p_\phi - p_\psi\cos\theta = I_1\dot{\phi}\sin^2\theta$$

we have

$$\dot{\phi} = \frac{p_\phi - p_\psi\cos\theta}{I_1\sin^2\theta}\,,$$

and to eliminate dφ/dt, substitute this result into p_{ψ} and solve for dψ/dt to find

$$\dot{\psi} = \frac{p_\psi}{I_3} - \cos\theta \left(\frac{p_\phi - p_\psi\cos\theta}{I_1\sin^2\theta}\right) \,.$$

The Routhian can be taken to be

$$R(\theta,\dot{\theta}) = p_\psi\dot{\psi} + p_\phi\dot{\phi} - L = \frac{1}{2}(p_\psi\dot{\psi} + p_\phi\dot{\phi}) - \frac{I_1 \dot{\theta}^2}{2} + Mg\ell \cos\theta$$

and since

$$\frac{p_\phi\dot{\phi}}{2} = \frac{p_\phi^2}{2I_1\sin^2\theta} - \frac{p_\psi p_\phi\cos\theta}{2I_1\sin^2\theta}\,,$$

$$\frac{p_\psi \dot{\psi}}{2} = \frac{p_\psi^2}{2I_3} - \frac{p_\psi p_\phi\cos\theta  }{2I_1\sin^2\theta} + \frac{p_\psi^2 \cos^2\theta}{2I_1\sin^2\theta}$$

we have

$$R =  \frac{p_\psi^2}{2I_3} + \frac{p_\psi^2 \cos^2\theta}{2I_1\sin^2\theta} + \frac{p_\phi^2}{2I_1\sin^2\theta} - \frac{p_\psi p_\phi\cos\theta}{I_1\sin^2\theta} - \frac{I_1 \dot{\theta}^2}{2} + Mg\ell \cos\theta \,.$$

The first term is constant, and can be ignored since only the derivatives of R will enter the equations of motion. The simplified Routhian, without loss of information, is thus

$$R = \frac{1}{2I_1\sin^2\theta}\left[p_\psi^2 \cos^2\theta + p_\phi^2 - 2 p_\psi p_\phi \cos\theta\right] - \frac{I_1 \dot{\theta}^2}{2} + Mg\ell \cos\theta$$

The equation of motion for θ is, by direct calculation,

$$\frac{d}{dt}\frac{\partial R}{\partial \dot{\theta}} = \frac{\partial R}{\partial \theta} \quad \Rightarrow \quad$$

$$-I_1\ddot{\theta} = -\frac{\cos\theta}{I_1\sin^3\theta}\left[p_\psi^2 \cos^2\theta + p_\phi^2 - \frac{p_\psi p_\phi}{2} \cos\theta\right] + \frac{1}{2I_1\sin^2\theta} \left[-2 p_\psi^2 \cos\theta\sin\theta + \frac{p_\psi p_\phi}{2} \sin\theta\right] -Mg\ell\sin\theta \,,$$

or by introducing the constants

$$a = \frac{p_\psi^2}{I_1^2} \,,\quad b = \frac{p_\phi^2}{I_1^2}\,,\quad c=\frac{p_\psi p_\phi}{2 I_1^2}\,,\quad k= \frac{Mg\ell}{I_1}\,,$$

a simpler form of the equation is obtained

$$\ddot{\theta} = \frac{\cos\theta}{\sin^3\theta}( a\cos^2\theta +b -c\cos\theta ) + \frac{1}{2\sin\theta} (2 a \cos\theta - c) + k\sin\theta \,.$$

Although the equation is highly nonlinear, there is only one equation to solve for, it was obtained directly, and the cyclic coordinates are not involved.

By contrast, the Lagrangian approach leads to three nonlinear coupled equations to solve, despite the absence of the coordinates ψ and φ in the Lagrangian.

The θ equation is

$$\frac{d}{dt}\frac{\partial L}{\partial \dot{\theta}} = \frac{\partial L}{\partial \theta} \quad\Rightarrow \quad I_1\ddot{\theta} = (I_1- I_3)\dot{\phi}^2\sin\theta\cos\theta -I_3\dot{\psi}\dot{\phi}\sin\theta +Mg\ell\sin\theta\,,$$

the ψ equation is

$$\frac{d}{dt}\frac{\partial L}{\partial \dot{\psi}} = \frac{\partial L}{\partial \psi} \quad\Rightarrow \quad  \ddot{\psi} +  \ddot{\phi}\cos\theta - \dot{\phi}\dot{\theta}\sin\theta= 0 \,,$$

and the φ equation is

$$\frac{d}{dt}\frac{\partial L}{\partial \dot{\phi}} = \frac{\partial L}{\partial \phi} \quad\Rightarrow \quad \ddot{\phi}(I_1\sin^2\theta + I_3\cos^2\theta) + \dot{\phi}(I_1 - I_3)2\sin\theta\cos\theta\dot{\theta} + I_3\ddot{\psi}\cos\theta - I_3\dot{\psi}\sin\theta\dot{\theta} =0 \,,$$

=== Velocity-dependent potentials ===
==== Classical charged particle in a uniform magnetic field ====
Classical charged particle in uniform B field, using cylindrical coordinates. Top: If the radial coordinate r and angular velocity dθ/dt vary, the trajectory is a helicoid with varying radius but uniform motion in the z direction. Bottom: Constant r and dθ/dt means a helicoid with constant radius.

Consider a classical charged particle of mass m and electric charge q in a static (time-independent) uniform (constant throughout space) magnetic field B. The Lagrangian for a charged particle in a general electromagnetic field given by the magnetic potential A and electric potential $\phi$ is

$$L = \frac{m}{2} \dot{\mathbf{r}}^2 - q \phi + q \dot{\mathbf{r}} \cdot \mathbf{A} \,,$$

It is convenient to use cylindrical coordinates (r, θ, z), so that

$$\dot{\mathbf{r}} = \mathbf{v} = (v_r, v_\theta,v_z) = (\dot{r},r\dot{\theta},\dot{z}) \,,$$
$$\mathbf{B} = (B_r,B_\theta,B_z) = (0,0,B)\,.$$

In this case of no electric field, the electric potential is zero, $\phi=0$, and we can choose the axial gauge for the magnetic potential

$$\mathbf{A} = \frac{1}{2}\mathbf{B}\times\mathbf{r} \quad \Rightarrow \quad \mathbf{A} = (A_r,A_\theta,A_z) = (0,Br/2,0)\,,$$

and the Lagrangian is

$$L(r,\dot{r},\dot{\theta},\dot{z}) = \frac{m}{2} (\dot{r}^2 + r^2\dot{\theta}^2 + \dot{z}^2) + \frac{qB r^2\dot{\theta}}{2} \,.$$

Notice this potential has an effectively cylindrical symmetry (although it also has angular velocity dependence), since the only spatial dependence is on the radial length from an imaginary cylinder axis.

There are two cyclic coordinates, θ and z. The canonical momenta conjugate to θ and z are the constants

$$p_{\theta} = \frac{\partial L}{\partial \dot {\theta}} = mr^2\dot {\theta} + \frac{qBr^2}{2}  \,,\quad p_z = \frac{\partial L}{\partial \dot {z}} = m\dot{z} \,,$$

so the velocities are

$$\dot {\theta} = \frac{1}{mr^2}\left(p_\theta - \frac{qBr^2}{2}\right) \,,\quad \dot{z} = \frac{p_z}{m}\,.$$

The angular momentum about the z axis is not p_{θ}, but the quantity mr^{2}dθ/dt, which is not conserved due to the contribution from the magnetic field. The canonical momentum p_{θ} is the conserved quantity. It is still the case that p_{z} is the linear or translational momentum along the z axis, which is also conserved.

The radial component r and angular velocity dθ/dt can vary with time, but p_{θ} is constant, and since p_{z} is constant it follows dz/dt is constant. The Routhian can take the form

$$\begin{align}
R(r,\dot{r}) & = p_{\theta}\dot{\theta}+p_z\dot{z} - L \\
& = p_{\theta}\dot{\theta}+p_z\dot{z} - \frac{m}{2}\dot r^2 - \frac{p_\theta\dot{\theta}}{2} - \frac{p_z\dot{z}}{2} - \frac{1}{2}qBr^2\dot{\theta} \\[6pt]
& =  (p_\theta - qBr^2 )\frac{\dot{\theta}}{2} - \frac{m}{2}\dot r^2 + \frac{p_z\dot{z}}{2} \\ [6pt]
& = \frac{1}{2mr^2} \left(p_\theta - qBr^2 \right)\left(p_\theta - \frac{qBr^2}{2} \right) - \frac{m}{2}\dot{r}^2 + \frac{p_z^2}{2m} \\[6pt]
& = \frac{1}{2mr^2} \left(p_\theta^2 - \frac{3}{2}qBr^2  + \frac{(qB)^2r^4}{2} \right) - \frac{m}{2}\dot{r}^2
\end{align}$$

where in the last line, the p_{z}^{2}/2m term is a constant and can be ignored without loss of continuity. The Hamiltonian equations for θ and z automatically vanish and do not need to be solved for. The Lagrangian equation in r

$$\frac{d}{dt}\frac{\partial R}{\partial \dot{r}} = \frac{\partial R}{\partial r}$$

is by direct calculation

$$-m\ddot{r} = \frac{1}{2m}\left[\frac{-2}{r^3} \left(p_\theta^2 - \frac{3}{2}qBr^2  + \frac{(qB)^2 r^4}{2} \right) + \frac{1}{r^2}(- 3qBr + 2(qB)^2r^3)\right] \,,$$

which after collecting terms is

$$m\ddot{r}=\frac{1}{2m}\left[\frac{2p_{\theta}^2}{r^3}-(qB)^2 r\right] \,,$$

and simplifying further by introducing the constants

$$a = \frac{p_{\theta}^2}{m^2} \,,\quad b = - \frac{(qB)^2}{2m^2} \,,$$

the differential equation is

$$\ddot{r} = \frac{a}{r^3} + br$$

To see how z changes with time, integrate the momenta expression for p_{z} above

$$z = \frac{p_z}{m}t + c_z \,,$$

where c_{z} is an arbitrary constant, the initial value of z to be specified in the initial conditions.

The motion of the particle in this system is helicoidal, with the axial motion uniform (constant) but the radial and angular components varying in a spiral according to the equation of motion derived above. The initial conditions on r, dr/dt, θ, dθ/dt, will determine if the trajectory of the particle has a constant r or varying r. If initially r is nonzero but dr/dt = 0, while θ and dθ/dt are arbitrary, then the initial velocity of the particle has no radial component, r is constant, so the motion will be in a perfect helix. If r is constant, the angular velocity is also constant according to the conserved p_{θ}.

With the Lagrangian approach, the equation for r would include dθ/dt which has to be eliminated, and there would be equations for θ and z to solve for.

The r equation is

$$\frac{d}{dt} \frac{\partial L}{\partial \dot{r}} = \frac{\partial L}{\partial r} \quad\Rightarrow\quad m\ddot{r} = mr\dot{\theta}^2 + qBr\dot{\theta} \,,$$

the θ equation is

$$\frac{d}{dt} \frac{\partial L}{\partial \dot{\theta}} = \frac{\partial L}{\partial \theta} \quad\Rightarrow\quad m(2r\dot{r}\dot {\theta} + r^2\ddot {\theta}) + qBr\dot{r} = 0 \,,$$

and the z equation is

$$\frac{d}{dt} \frac{\partial L}{\partial \dot{z}} = \frac{\partial L}{\partial z} \quad\Rightarrow\quad m\ddot{z} = 0 \,.$$

The z equation is trivial to integrate, but the r and θ equations are not, in any case the time derivatives are mixed in all the equations and must be eliminated.

== See also ==
- Calculus of variations
- Phase space
- Configuration space
- Many-body problem
- Rigid body mechanics
