= Jury stability criterion =

Method of determining the stability of a discrete-time linear system

In signal processing and control theory, the Jury stability criterion is a method of determining the stability of a discrete-time, linear system by analysis of the coefficients of its characteristic polynomial. It is the discrete time analogue of the Routh–Hurwitz stability criterion. The Jury stability criterion requires that the system poles are located inside the unit circle centered at the origin, while the Routh-Hurwitz stability criterion requires that the poles are in the left half of the complex plane. The Jury criterion is named after Eliahu Ibraham Jury.

== Method ==
If the characteristic polynomial of the system is given by

$$f(z) = a_n + a_{n-1}z^1 + a_{n-2}z^2 + \dots + a_1z^{n-1} + a_0z^n$$

then the table is constructed as follows:

$$\begin{array}{lcccccc}
\underline\text{row} & \ \underline{z^n} \ & \ \underline{z^{n-1}} \ & \ \underline{z^{n-2}} \ & \ \cdots \ & \ \underline{z^1} \ & \ \underline{z^0} \ \\[8pt]
1 & a_0 & a_1 & a_2 & \cdots & a_{n-1} & a_n \\[4pt]
2 & a_n & a_{n-1} & a_{n-2} & \cdots & a_1 & a_0 \\[10pt]
3 & b_0 & b_1 & \cdots & b_{n-2} & b_{n-1} \\[4pt]
4 & b_{n-1} & b_{n-2} & \cdots & b_1 & b_0 \\[10pt]
5 & c_0 & c_1 & \cdots & c_{n-2} &  \\[4pt]
6 & c_{n-2} & c_{n-3} & \cdots & c_0 &  & \\[10pt]
\ \!\vdots & \vdots & \vdots & \vdots & \vdots &  &  \\[10pt]
2n-5 \quad & p_0 & p_1 & p_2 & p_3 &  & \\[4pt]
2n-4 & p_3 & p_2 & p_1 & p_0 &  & \\[10pt]
2n-3 & q_2 & q_1 & q_0 &  &  &
\end{array}$$

That is, the first row is constructed of the polynomial coefficients in order, and the second row is the first row in reverse order and conjugated.

The third row of the table is calculated by subtracting $\tfrac{a_n}{a_0}$ times the second row from the first row, and the fourth row is the third row with the first n elements reversed (as the final element is zero).

$$\begin{array}{ccccc}
a_0 &  a_1 & \dots & a_{n-1} & \quad a_n \quad \\[4pt]
a_n & a_{n-1} & \dots & a_1 & a_0 \\[4pt]
a_0 - a_n \frac{a_n}{a_0} & a_1 - a_{n-1} \frac{a_n}{a_0} & \dots & a_{n-1} - a_1 \frac{a_n}{a_0} & 0 \\[4pt]
a_{n-1} - a_1 \frac{a_n}{a_0} & \dots & a_1 - a_{n-1} \frac{a_n}{a_0} & a_0 - a_n \frac{a_n}{a_0} & 0
\end{array}$$

The expansion of the table is continued in this manner until a row containing only one non-zero element is reached.

Note the $\tfrac{a_n}{a_0}$ is $a_n$ for the 1st two rows. Then for 3rd and 4th row the coefficient changes (i.e. $\tfrac{b_{n-1}}{b_0}$). This can be viewed as the new polynomial which has one less degree and then continuing.

== Stability test ==
If ${a_0}>0$ then for every value of $a_0, b_0, c_0$... that is negative, the polynomial has one root outside of the unit disc. This implies that the method can be stopped after the first negative value is found when checking for stability.

== Sample implementation ==
This method is very easy to implement using dynamic arrays on a computer. It also tells whether all the modulus of the roots (complex and real) lie inside the unit disc. The vector v contains the real coefficients of the original polynomial in the order from highest degree to lowest degree.

        /* vvd is the jury array */
        vvd.push_back(v); // Store the first row
        reverse(v.begin(),v.end());
        vvd.push_back(v); // Store the second row

        for (i=2;;i+=2)
        {
            v.clear();
            double mult = vvd[i-2][vvd[i-2].size()-1]/vvd[i-2][0]; // This is an/a0 as mentioned in the article.

            for (j=0; j<vvd[i-2].size()-1; j++) // Take the last 2 rows and compute the next row
                   v.push_back(vvd[i-2][j] - vvd[i-1][j] * mult);

            vvd.push_back(v);
            reverse(v.begin(), v.end()); // reverse the next row
            vvd.push_back(v);
            if (v.size() == 1) break;
         }

         // Check is done using
         for (i=0; i<vvd.size(); i+=2)
         {
              if (vvd[i][0]<=0) break;
         }

         if (i == vvd.size())
              "All roots lie inside unit disc "
         else
              "no"

== See also ==
- Liénard–Chipart criterion, another stability criterion derived from Routh-Hurwitz (for continuous-time systems)
