= Kharitonov's theorem =

Stability criterion for a dynamical system

Kharitonov's theorem is a result used in control theory to assess the stability of a dynamical system when the physical parameters of the system are not known precisely. When the coefficients of the characteristic polynomial are known, the Routh–Hurwitz stability criterion can be used to check if the system is stable (i.e. if all roots have negative real parts). Kharitonov's theorem can be used in the case where the coefficients are only known to be within specified ranges. It provides a test of stability for a so-called interval polynomial, while Routh–Hurwitz is concerned with an ordinary polynomial.

== Definition ==
An interval polynomial is the family of all polynomials

$$p(s)= a_0 + a_1 s^1 + a_2 s^2 + ... + a_n s^n$$

where each coefficient $a_i \in R$ can take any value in the specified intervals

$$l_i \le a_i \le u_i.$$

It is also assumed that the leading coefficient cannot be zero: $0 \notin [l_n, u_n]$.

== Theorem ==
An interval polynomial is stable (i.e. all members of the family are stable) if and only if the four so-called Kharitonov polynomials

$$k_1(s) = l_0 + l_1 s^1 + u_2 s^2 +  u_3 s^3 + l_4 s^4 + l_5 s^5 + \cdots$$
$$k_2(s) = u_0 + u_1 s^1 + l_2 s^2 +  l_3 s^3 + u_4 s^4 + u_5 s^5 + \cdots$$
$$k_3(s) = l_0 + u_1 s^1 + u_2 s^2 +  l_3 s^3 + l_4 s^4 + u_5 s^5 + \cdots$$
$$k_4(s) = u_0 + l_1 s^1 + l_2 s^2 +  u_3 s^3 + u_4 s^4 + l_5 s^5 + \cdots$$

are stable.

What is somewhat surprising about Kharitonov's result is that although in principle we are testing an infinite number of polynomials for stability, in fact we need to test only four. This we can do using Routh–Hurwitz or any other method. So it only takes four times more work to be informed about the stability of an interval polynomial than it takes to test one ordinary polynomial for stability.

Kharitonov's theorem is useful in the field of robust control, which seeks to design systems that will work well despite uncertainties in component behavior due to measurement errors, changes in operating conditions, equipment wear and so on.
