= Stable polynomial =

Characteristic polynomial whose associated linear system is stable

A polynomial is defined to be stable in two different ways.

- Hurwitz-stable: In the context of a differential equation (continuous-time) the characteristic polynomial is stable if all its roots lie in the open left complex half-plane.
- Schur-stable: In the context of a difference equation (discrete-time), its characteristic polynomial is stable if all its roots lie in the open complex unit disk.

Also, in control theory, a linear, time-invariant system (see LTI system theory) is said to be BIBO stable if every bounded input produces bounded output. A linear system is BIBO stable if its denominator characteristic polynomial is stable (Hurwitz stable for a continuous-time system, Schur stable for discrete-time). In practice, stability is tested via several stability criteria.

== Properties ==
- The Routh–Hurwitz theorem provides an algorithm for determining if a given polynomial is Hurwitz stable, which is implemented in the Routh–Hurwitz and Liénard–Chipart tests.
- To test if a given polynomial P (of degree d) is Schur stable, it suffices to apply this theorem to the transformed polynomial

$$Q(z)=(z-1)^d P\left({{z+1}\over{z-1}}\right)$$

obtained after the Möbius transformation $z \mapsto {{z+1}\over{z-1}}$ which maps the left half-plane to the open unit disc: P is Schur stable if and only if Q is Hurwitz stable and $P(1)\neq 0$. For higher degree polynomials the extra computation involved in this mapping can be avoided by testing the Schur stability by the Schur-Cohn test, the Jury test or the Bistritz test.

- Necessary condition: a Hurwitz stable polynomial (with real coefficients) has coefficients of the same sign (either all positive or all negative).
- Sufficient condition: a polynomial $f(z) = a_0+a_1 z+\cdots+a_n z^n$ with (real) coefficients such that

$$a_n>a_{n-1}>\cdots>a_0 > 0,$$

is Schur stable.

- Product rule: Two polynomials f and g are stable (of the same type) if and only if the product fg is stable.
- Hadamard product: The Hadamard (coefficient-wise) product of two Hurwitz stable polynomials is again Hurwitz stable.

== Examples ==
- $4z^3+3z^2+2z+1$ is Schur stable because it satisfies the sufficient condition;
- $z^{10}$ is Schur stable (because all its roots equal 0) but it does not satisfy the sufficient condition;
- $z^2-z-2$ is not Hurwitz stable (its roots are −1 and 2) because it violates the necessary condition;
- $z^2+3z+2$ is Hurwitz stable (its roots are −1 and −2).
- The polynomial $z^4+z^3+z^2+z+1$ (with positive coefficients) is neither Hurwitz stable nor Schur stable. Its roots are the four primitive fifth roots of unity

$$z_k=\cos\left({{2\pi k}\over 5}\right)+i \sin\left({{2\pi k}\over 5}\right), \, k=1, \ldots, 4\, .$$

Note here that

$$\cos({{2\pi}/5})={{\sqrt{5}-1}\over 4}>0.$$

It is a "boundary case" for Schur stability because its roots lie on the unit circle. The example also shows that the necessary (positivity) conditions stated above for Hurwitz stability are not sufficient.

== Stable matrices ==
Just as stable polynomials are crucial for assessing the stability of systems described by polynomials, stability matrices play a vital role in evaluating the stability of systems represented by matrices.

=== Hurwitz matrix ===
A square matrix A is called a Hurwitz matrix if every eigenvalue of A has strictly negative real part.

=== Schur matrix ===
Schur matrices is an analogue of the Hurwitz matrices for discrete-time systems. A matrix A is a Schur (stable) matrix if its eigenvalues are located in the open unit disk in the complex plane.

== See also ==
- Kharitonov region
- Stability criterion
- Stability radius
