= Routh–Hurwitz theorem =

Test for whether a polynomial's roots lie in the left-half complex plane

In mathematics, the Routh–Hurwitz theorem gives a test to determine whether all roots of a given polynomial lie in the left-half complex plane. Polynomials with this property are called Hurwitz stable polynomials. The Routh–Hurwitz theorem is important in dynamical systems and control theory, because the characteristic polynomial of the differential equations of a stable, linear system has roots limited to the left half plane (negative eigenvalues). Thus the theorem provides a mathematical test, the Routh–Hurwitz stability criterion, to determine whether a linear dynamical system is stable without solving the system. The Routh–Hurwitz theorem was proved in 1895, and it was named after Edward John Routh and Adolf Hurwitz.

== Notations ==
Let f(z) be a polynomial (with complex coefficients) of degree n with no roots on the imaginary axis (i.e. the line z = ic where i is the imaginary unit and c is a real number). Let us define real polynomials P_{0}(y) and P_{1}(y) by f(iy) = P_{0}(y) + iP_{1}(y), respectively the real and imaginary parts of f on the imaginary line.

Furthermore, let us denote by:

- p the number of roots of f in the left half-plane (taking into account multiplicities);
- q the number of roots of f in the right half-plane (taking into account multiplicities);
- Δ arg f(iy) the variation of the argument of f(iy) when y runs from −∞ to +∞;
- w(x) is the number of variations of the generalized Sturm chain obtained from P_{0}(y) and P_{1}(y) by applying the Euclidean algorithm;
- I^{+∞}_{−∞} r is the Cauchy index of the rational function r over the real line.

== Statement ==
With the notations introduced above, the Routh–Hurwitz theorem states that:

$$p-q=\frac{1}{\pi}\Delta\arg f(iy)= \left.\begin{cases} +I_{-\infty}^{+\infty}\frac{P_0(y)}{P_1(y)} & \text{for odd degree} \\[10pt] -I_{-\infty}^{+\infty}\frac{P_1(y)}{P_0(y)} & \text{for even degree} \end{cases}\right\} = w(+\infty)-w(-\infty).$$

From the first equality we can for instance conclude that when the variation of the argument of f(iy) is positive, then f(z) will have more roots to the left of the imaginary axis than to its right. The equality p − q = w(+∞) − w(−∞) can be viewed as the complex counterpart of Sturm's theorem. Note the differences: in Sturm's theorem, the left member is p + q and the w from the right member is the number of variations of a Sturm chain (while w refers to a generalized Sturm chain in the present theorem).

== Routh–Hurwitz stability criterion ==
We can easily determine a stability criterion using this theorem as it is trivial that f(z) is Hurwitz-stable if and only if p − q = n. We thus obtain conditions on the coefficients of f(z) by imposing w(+∞) = n and w(−∞) = 0.

== See also ==
- Plastic ratio
