= Liénard–Chipart criterion =

Condition for control system stability

In control theory, the Liénard–Chipart criterion is a stability criterion modified from the Routh–Hurwitz stability criterion, proposed in 1914 by French physicists A. Liénard and M. H. Chipart. This criterion has a computational advantage over the Routh–Hurwitz criterion because it involves only about half the number of determinant computations.

== Algorithm ==
The Routh–Hurwitz stability criterion says that a necessary and sufficient condition for all the roots of the polynomial with real coefficients

$$f(z) = a_0 z^n + a_1 z^{n-1} + \cdots + a_n, \quad a_0 > 0$$

to have negative real parts (i.e. f is Hurwitz stable) is that

$$\Delta_1 > 0,\, \Delta_2 > 0, \ \ldots, \ \Delta_n > 0,$$

where Δ_{i} is the i-th leading principal minor of the Hurwitz matrix associated with f.

Using the same notation as above, the Liénard–Chipart criterion is that f is Hurwitz stable if and only if any one of the four conditions is satisfied:

$$\begin{align}
1) \quad& a_n > 0,\ a_{n-2} > 0,\ a_{n-4} > 0,\ \ldots \\
&\Delta_1 > 0,\ \Delta_3 > 0,\ \ldots \\[4pt]
2) \quad& a_n > 0,\ a_{n-2} > 0,\ a_{n-4} > 0,\ \ldots \\
& \Delta_2 > 0,\ \Delta_4 > 0,\ \ldots \\[4pt]
3) \quad& a_n > 0,\ a_{n-1} > 0,\ a_{n-3} > 0,\ \ldots \\
&\Delta_1 > 0,\ \Delta_3 > 0,\ \ldots \\[4pt]
4) \quad& a_n > 0,\ a_{n-1} > 0,\ a_{n-3}  > 0,\ \ldots \\
&\Delta_2 > 0,\ \Delta_4 > 0,\ \ldots
\end{align}$$

Hence one can see that by choosing one of these conditions, the number of determinants required to be evaluated is reduced.

Alternatively Fuller formulated this as follows for (noticing that Δ_{1} > 0 is never needed to be checked):

$$\begin{align}
& a_n > 0,\ a_1 > 0,\ a_3 > 0,\ a_5 > 0,\  \ldots; \\
& \Delta_{n-1} > 0,\ \Delta_{n-3} > 0,\ \Delta_{n-5} > 0,\ \ldots,\
\begin{cases}
n \text{ even} & \Delta_3 > 0 \\
n \text{ odd} & \Delta_2 > 0
\end{cases}
\end{align}$$

This means if n is even, the second line ends in Δ_{3} > 0 and if n is odd, it ends in Δ_{2} > 0 and so this is just condition (2) for odd n and condition (3) for even n from above. The first line always ends in a_{n}, but a_{n-1} > 0 is also needed for even n.
