= Routh–Hurwitz matrix =

Matrix used to analyze the stability of a polynomial by its coefficients

In mathematics, the Routh–Hurwitz matrix, or more commonly just Hurwitz matrix, corresponding to a polynomial is a particular matrix whose nonzero entries are coefficients of the polynomial.

== Hurwitz matrix and the Hurwitz stability criterion ==
Namely, given a real polynomial

$$p(z)=a_{0}z^n+a_{1}z^{n-1}+\cdots+a_{n-1}z+a_n$$

the $n\times n$ square matrix

$$H=
\begin{pmatrix}
a_1 & a_3 & a_5 & \dots & \dots & \dots & 0 & 0 & 0 \\
a_0 & a_2 & a_4 & & & & \vdots & \vdots & \vdots \\
0 & a_1 & a_3 & & & & \vdots & \vdots & \vdots \\
\vdots & a_0 & a_2 & \ddots & & & 0 & \vdots & \vdots \\
\vdots & 0 & a_1 & & \ddots & & a_n & \vdots & \vdots \\
\vdots & \vdots  & a_0 & & & \ddots &  a_{n-1} & 0 & \vdots \\
\vdots & \vdots  & 0 & & & & a_{n-2} & a_n & \vdots \\
\vdots & \vdots & \vdots & & & & a_{n-3} & a_{n-1} & 0 \\
0 & 0 & 0 & \dots & \dots & \dots & a_{n-4} & a_{n-2} & a_n
\end{pmatrix}.$$

is called Hurwitz matrix corresponding to the polynomial $p$. It was established by Adolf Hurwitz in 1895 that a real polynomial with $a_0 > 0$ is stable (that is, all its roots have strictly negative real part) if and only if all the leading principal minors of the matrix $H(p)$ are positive:

$$\begin{align}
\Delta_1(p) &= \begin{vmatrix} a_{1} \end{vmatrix} &&=a_{1} > 0 \\[2mm]
\Delta_2(p) &= \begin{vmatrix}
a_{1} & a_{3} \\
a_{0} & a_{2} \\
\end{vmatrix} &&= a_2 a_1 - a_0 a_3 > 0\\[2mm]
\Delta_3(p) &= \begin{vmatrix}
a_{1} & a_{3} & a_{5} \\
a_{0} & a_{2} & a_{4} \\
0     & a_{1} & a_{3} \\
\end{vmatrix} &&= a_3 \Delta_2 - a_1 (a_1 a_4 - a_0 a_5 ) > 0
\end{align}$$

and so on. The minors $\Delta_k(p)$ are called the Hurwitz determinants. Similarly, if $a_0 < 0$ then the polynomial is stable if and only if the principal minors have alternating signs starting with a negative one.

== Example ==
As an example, consider the matrix

$$M=
\begin{pmatrix}
-1 & -1 & 0 \\
1 & -1 & 0 \\
0 & 0 & -1
\end{pmatrix},$$

and let

$$\begin{align}
p(x)&=\det(xI-M)\\
&=
\begin{vmatrix}
x+1 & 1 & 0 \\
-1 & x+1 & 0 \\
0 & 0 & x+1
\end{vmatrix}\\
&=(x+1)^3-(1)(-1)(x+1)\\
&=x^3+3x^2+4x+2
\end{align}$$

be the characteristic polynomial of $M$. The Routh–Hurwitz matrix (Note: Both Routh–Hurwitz and Hurwitz-stable matrices are more commonly referred to simply as Hurwitz matrices. To reduce the risk of confusion, this section avoids that terminology.) associated to $p$ is then

$$H=
\begin{pmatrix}
3 & 2 & 0 \\
1 & 4 & 0 \\
0 & 3 & 2
\end{pmatrix}.$$

The leading principal minors of $H$ are

$$\begin{align}
\Delta_1(p) &= \begin{vmatrix} 3\end{vmatrix} &&=3>0\\[2mm]
\Delta_2(p) &= \begin{vmatrix}
3 & 2 \\
1 & 4 \\
\end{vmatrix} &&= 12 - 2 = 10 > 0\\[2mm]
\Delta_3(p) &= \begin{vmatrix}
3 & 2 & 0 \\
1 & 4 & 0 \\
0 & 3 & 2 \\
\end{vmatrix} &&= 2\Delta_2(p)=20 > 0.
\end{align}$$

Since the leading principal minors are all positive, all of the roots of $p$ have negative real part. Moreover, since $p$ is the characteristic polynomial of $M$, it follows that all the eigenvalues of $M$ have negative real part, and hence $M$ is a Hurwitz-stable matrix.

== See also ==
- Routh–Hurwitz stability criterion
- Liénard–Chipart criterion
- P-matrix
