= Cauchy index =

In mathematical analysis, the Cauchy index is an integer associated to a real rational function over an interval. By the Routh–Hurwitz theorem, we have the following interpretation: for two polynomials p,q, let the rational function

r(x) = p(x)/q(x),

and the complex polynomial f(z) be given by

f(iy) = q(y) + ip(y).

Then, the Cauchy index of r over the real line is the difference between the number of roots of f(z) located in the right half-plane and those located in the left half-plane. We must also assume that p has degree less than the degree of q.

== Definition ==
- The Cauchy index was first defined for a pole s of the rational function r by Augustin-Louis Cauchy in 1837 using one-sided limits as:

$$I_sr = \begin{cases}
+1, & \text{if } \displaystyle\lim_{x\uparrow s}r(x)=-\infty \;\land\; \lim_{x\downarrow s}r(x)=+\infty, \\
-1, & \text{if } \displaystyle\lim_{x\uparrow s}r(x)=+\infty \;\land\; \lim_{x\downarrow s}r(x)=-\infty, \\
0, & \text{otherwise.}
\end{cases}$$

- A generalization over the compact interval [a,b] is direct (when neither a nor b are poles of r(x)): it is the sum of the Cauchy indices $I_s$ of r for each s located in the interval. We usually denote it by $I_a^br$.
- We can then generalize to intervals of type $[-\infty,+\infty]$ since the number of poles of r is a finite number (by taking the limit of the Cauchy index over [a,b] for a and b going to infinity).

== Examples ==
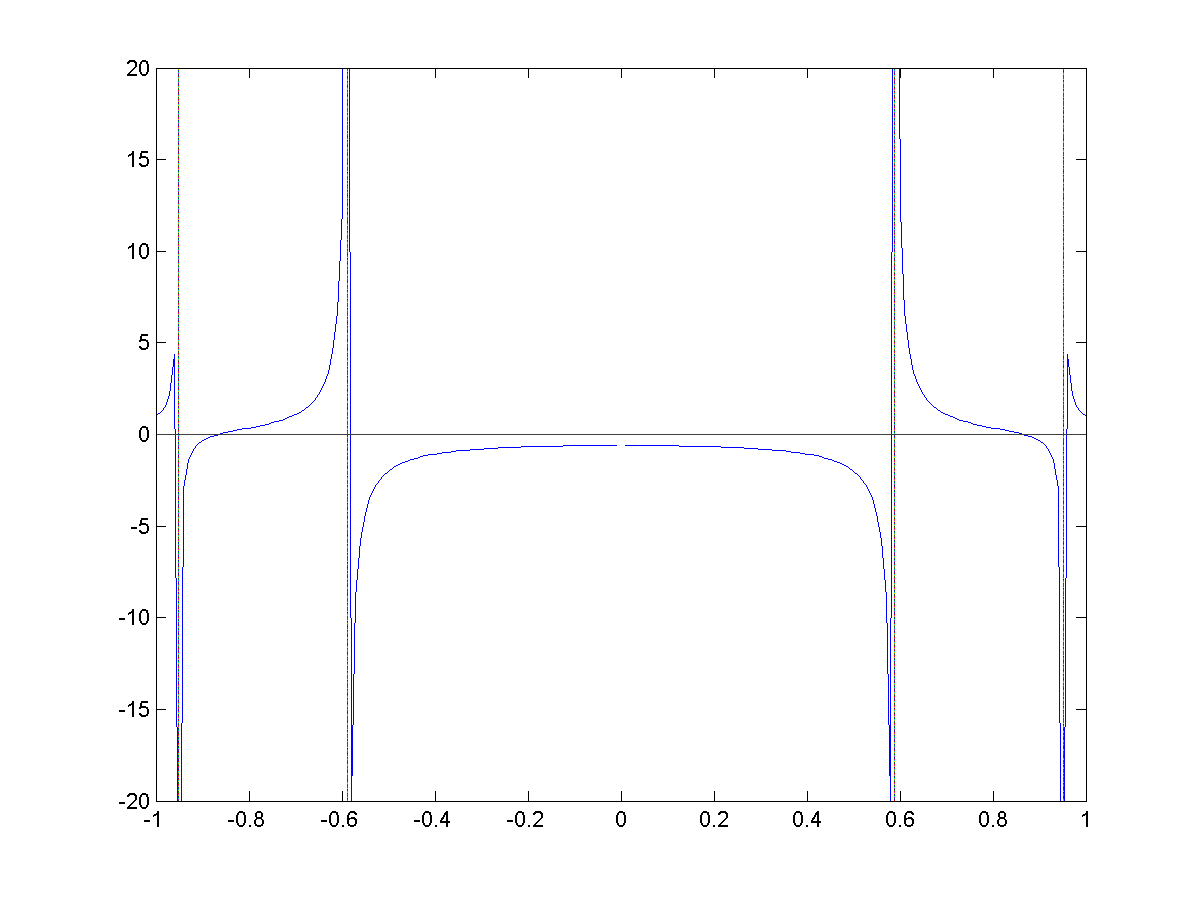
A rational function

- Consider the rational function:

$$r(x)=\frac{4x^3 -3x}{16x^5 -20x^3 +5x}=\frac{p(x)}{q(x)}.$$

We recognize in p(x) and q(x) respectively the Chebyshev polynomials of degree 3 and 5. Therefore, r(x) has poles $x_1=0.9511$, $x_2=0.5878$, $x_3=0$, $x_4=-0.5878$ and $x_5=-0.9511$, i.e. $x_j=\cos((2j-1)\pi/2n)$ for $j = 1,...,5$. We can see on the picture that $I_{x_1}r=I_{x_2}r=1$ and $I_{x_4}r=I_{x_5}r=-1$. For the pole in zero, we have $I_{x_3}r=0$ since the left and right limits are equal (which is because p(x) also has a root in zero). We conclude that $I_{-1}^1r=0=I_{-\infty}^{+\infty}r$ since q(x) has only five roots, all in [−1,1]. We cannot use here the Routh–Hurwitz theorem as each complex polynomial with f(iy) = q(y) + ip(y) has a zero on the imaginary line (namely at the origin).
