= Derrick's theorem =

Physics theorem argued by G. H. Derrick

Derrick's theorem is an argument by physicist G. H. Derrick which shows that stationary localized solutions to a nonlinear wave equation or nonlinear Klein–Gordon equation in spatial dimensions three and higher are unstable.

== Original argument ==
Derrick's paper, which was considered an obstacle to interpreting soliton-like solutions as particles, contained the following physical argument about non-existence of stable localized stationary solutions to the nonlinear wave equation

$$\nabla^2 \theta-\frac{\partial^2\theta}{\partial t^2}=\frac 1 2 f'(\theta),
\qquad
\theta(x,t)\in\R,\quad x\in\R^3,$$

now known under the name of Derrick's Theorem. (Above, $f(s)$ is a differentiable function with $f'(0)=0$.)

The energy of the time-independent solution $\theta(x)\,$ is given by

$$E=\int\left[(\nabla\theta)^2+f(\theta)\right] \, d^3 x.$$

A necessary condition for the solution to be stable is $\delta^2 E\ge 0\,$. Suppose $\theta(x)\,$ is a localized solution of $\delta E=0\,$. Define $\theta_\lambda(x)=\theta(\lambda x)\,$ where $\lambda$ is an arbitrary constant, and write $I_1=\int(\nabla\theta)^2 d^3 x$, $I_2=\int f(\theta) d^3 x$. Then

$$E_\lambda
=\int\left[(\nabla\theta_\lambda)^2+f(\theta_\lambda)\right] \, d^3 x
=I_1/\lambda +I_2/\lambda^3.$$

Whence $dE_\lambda/d\lambda\vert_{\lambda=1}=-I_1-3 I_2=0.\,$ and since $I_1>0\,$,

$$\left.\frac{d^2E_\lambda}{d\lambda^2}\right|_{\lambda=1}=2 I_1+12 I_2=-2 I_1\,<0.$$

That is, $\delta^2 E<0\,$ for a variation corresponding to a uniform stretching of the particle. Hence the solution $\theta(x)\,$ is unstable.

Derrick's argument works for $x\in\R^n$, $n\ge 3\,$.

== Pokhozhaev's identity ==
More generally, let $g$ be continuous, with $g(0)=0$. Denote $G(s)=\int_0^s g(t)\,dt$. Let

$$u\in L^\infty_{\mathrm{loc}}(\R^n),
\qquad
\nabla u\in L^2(\R^n),
\qquad
G(u(\cdot))\in L^1(\R^n),
\qquad
n\in\N,$$

be a solution to the equation

$$-\nabla^2 u=g(u)$$,

in the sense of distributions. Then $u$ satisfies the relation

$$(n-2)\int_{\R^n}|\nabla u(x)|^2\,dx=n\int_{\R^n}G(u(x))\,dx,$$

known as Pokhozhaev's identity (sometimes spelled as Pohozaev's identity). This result is similar to the virial theorem.

== Interpretation in the Hamiltonian form ==
We may write the equation $\partial_t^2 u=\nabla^2 u-\frac{1}{2}f'(u)$ in the Hamiltonian form $\partial_t u=\delta_v H(u,v)$, $\partial_t v=-\delta_u H(u,v)$, where $u,\,v$ are functions of $x\in\R^n,\,t\in\R$, the Hamilton function is given by

$$H(u,v)=\int_{\R^n}\left(
\frac{1}{2}|v|^2+\frac{1}{2}|\nabla u|^2+\frac{1}{2}f(u)
\right)\,dx,$$

and $\delta_u H\,$, $\delta_v H\,$ are the variational derivatives of $H(u,v)\,$.

Then the stationary solution $u(x,t)=\theta(x)\,$ has the energy $H(\theta,0)=\int_{\R^n}\left( \frac{1}{2}|\nabla\theta|^2+\frac{1}{2}f(\theta) \right)\,d^n x$ and satisfies the equation

$$0=\partial_t \theta(x)=-\partial_u H(\theta,0)=\frac{1}{2}E'(\theta),$$

with $E'\,$ denoting a variational derivative of the functional $E=\int_{\R^n}[\vert\nabla\theta\vert^2+f(\theta)]\,d^n x$. Although the solution $\theta(x)\,$ is a critical point of $E\,$ (since $E'(\theta)=0\,$), Derrick's argument shows that $\frac{d^2}{d\lambda\,^2}E(\theta(\lambda x))<0$ at $\lambda=1\,$, hence $u(x,t)=\theta(x)\,$ is not a point of the local minimum of the energy functional $H\,$. Therefore, physically, the solution $\theta(x)\,$ is expected to be unstable. A related result, showing non-minimization of the energy of localized stationary states (with the argument also written for $n=3$, although the derivation being valid in dimensions $n\ge 2$) was obtained by R. H. Hobart in 1963.

== Relation to linear instability ==
A stronger statement, linear (or exponential) instability of localized stationary solutions to the nonlinear wave equation (in any spatial dimension) is proved by P. Karageorgis and W. A. Strauss in 2007.

== Stability of localized time-periodic solutions ==
Derrick describes some possible ways out of this difficulty, including the conjecture that Elementary particles might correspond to stable, localized solutions which are periodic in time, rather than time-independent. Indeed, it was later shown that a time-periodic solitary wave $u(x,t)=\phi_\omega(x)e^{-i\omega t}\,$ with frequency $\omega\,$ may be orbitally stable if the Vakhitov–Kolokolov stability criterion is satisfied.

== See also ==
- Orbital stability
- Pokhozhaev's identity
- Vakhitov–Kolokolov stability criterion
- Virial theorem
