= Dead disk =

Disk galaxy no longer able to form new stars

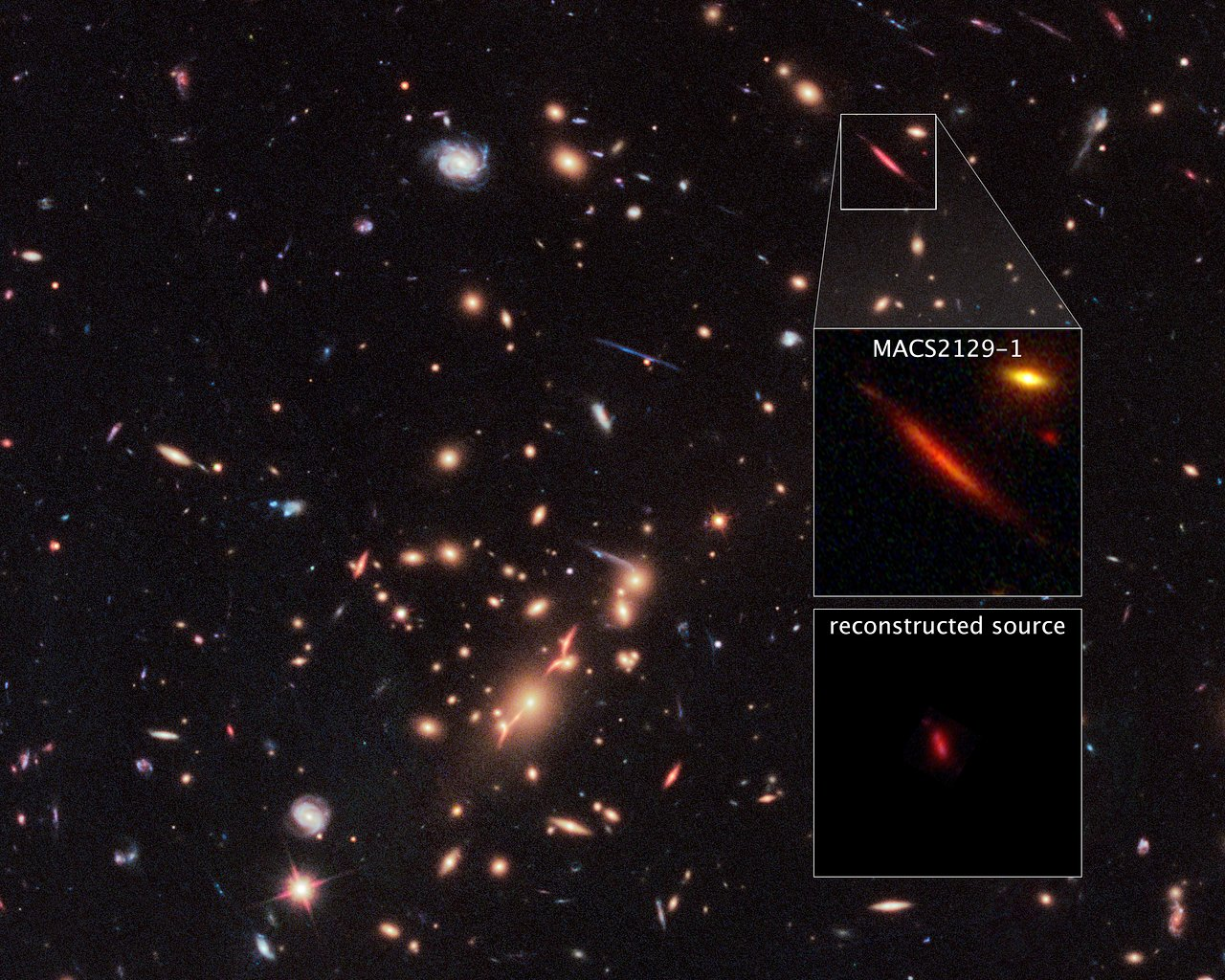
Hubble telescope image of the galaxy cluster MACS J2129-0741. The expanded box shows the red dead disk galaxy MACS 2129-1. The top image is distorted due to gravitational lensing, the bottom image undoes the distortion.

A dead disk galaxy is a quiescent galaxy with a disk-shaped structure. Quiescent galaxies, or ‘dead galaxies’, are no longer able to form new stars. They are often characterized as large, diffuse galaxies in dense galactic groups. Disk galaxies, either with spiral or lenticular morphology, are typically associated with ongoing star formation, fed by large gas reservoirs in the galaxy. Dead disk galaxies, however, have gas reservoirs unsuitable for star formation due to quenching processes.

== Formation and evolution ==
The dead disk galaxies observed thus far are massive (yet compact) fast-spinning disk-shaped galaxies at the center of clusters. As we are observing them at high redshift, or as they appeared billions of years ago, these galaxies stopped forming new stars when the universe was still relatively young in age. They may continue to evolve from dead disks into quiescent elliptical galaxies, like those seen in our modern universe.

The quenching process for dead disk galaxies remains unclear. It is likely a combination of quenching mechanisms, with the key exclusion of galaxy mergers which would disrupt the disk structure. Dead disk galaxies are observed to contain similar amounts of atomic gas as main-sequence disk galaxies, but contain far less molecular gas. Typically, atomic gas is converted into molecular gas as it cools, and cold molecular gas collapses to form stars. By some unknown mechanism(s), dead disk galaxies are unable to convert atomic gas into molecular gas, halting star formation.

== Examples ==
In 2024, astronomers identified the oldest dead disk yet, JADES-GS-z7-01-QU, a high redshift dwarf disk galaxy. Considered a "post-starburst galaxy", it appears to have experienced a short period of high star formation followed by sudden quenching. Possible quenching methods include:

- Shock heating of the available gas reservoir by nearby galaxies
- Radiation pressure from the galaxy's starburst period ejecting the available gas

Since observations of this galaxy show its state in the distant past, star formation may have restarted since then if cool gas was able to refill the galaxy’s reservoirs.

Other examples:

- MACS 2129-1
- GS-10578 ("Pablo’s Galaxy")

== Implications for cosmological models ==
Dead disk galaxies pose new challenges to earlier models of galaxy evolution and the chronology of the universe. Previous cosmological theories predicted that most disk galaxies would have evolved into chaotic ellipticals before ceasing star formation, which these quiescent disk galaxies have not done. Understanding the evolution of galaxies in the early universe is an active area of research.

== See also ==
- Galaxy formation and evolution - Theories of galaxy evolution and phases of stellar formation
- Quenching - Methods of stopping star formation in galaxies
- Red Nugget - Small elliptical quenched galaxies
- Dark Galaxy - Theoretical galaxy with no stars
