= BZB J1717+2931 =

BL Lacertae object in the constellation Hercules

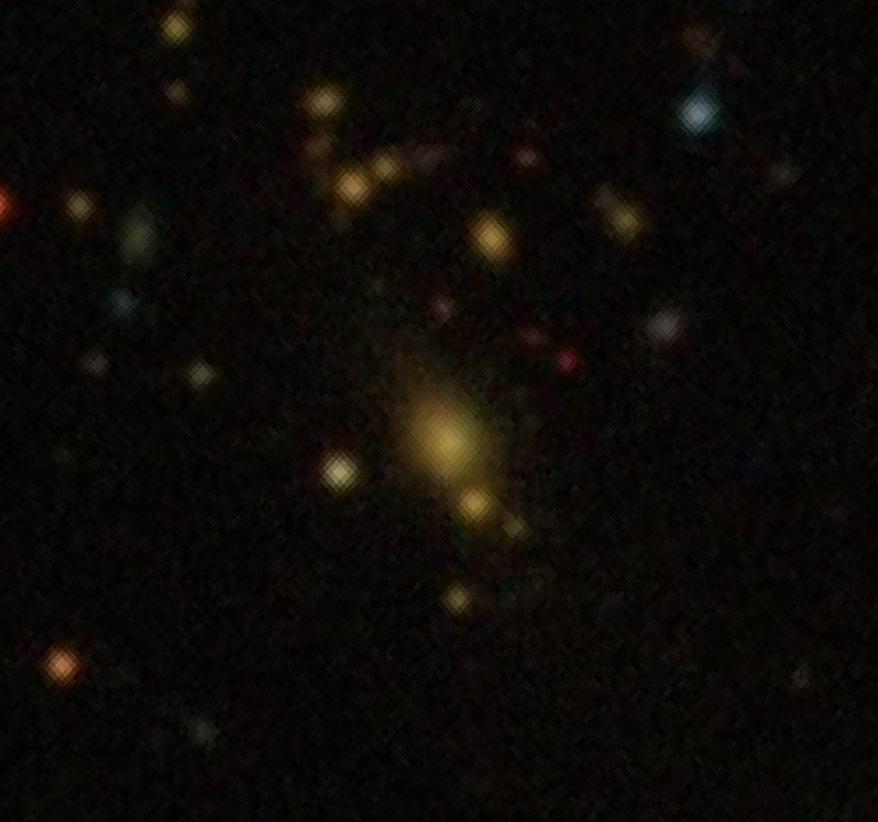
- SDSS image of BZB J1717+2931

Observation data (J2000.0 epoch)
- Constellation: Hercules
- Right ascension: 17^{h} 17^{m} 06.89^{s}
- Declination: +29° 31′ 21.05″
- Redshift: 0.277974
- Heliocentric radial velocity: 83,335 ± 7 km/s
- Distance: 4,023.7 ± 281.2 Mly (1,233.67 ± 86.21 Mpc)
- Group or cluster: RBS 1634
- magnitude (J): 15.30

Characteristics
- Type: BLLAC
- Size: ~638,000 ly (195.6 kpc) (estimated)

Other designations
- 2MASX J17170691+2931216, [MGL2009] 2226, LEDA 1869000, NVSS J171706+293117, SDSS J171706.89+293121.0, WHL J171706.9+293121 BCG

BZB J1717+2931 is a BL Lacertae object located in the constellation of Hercules. The redshift of the galaxy is (z) 0.277 and it is a member of the galaxy cluster, RBS 1634, residing as the brightest cluster galaxy (BCG).

BZB J1717+2931 is an active galactic nucleus (AGN) candidate. The optical spectrum of the galaxy displays strong signatures of emission lines, with the galaxy itself, displaying a color offset of -0.49 g – r magnitude. Evidence also found it is a galaxy-dominated (G type) BL Lacertae object with the u – r color index estimated to be 3.1 magnitude while the J – K color index is found to be 1.43 magnitude. The object is also a central elliptical galaxy with an estimated half viral radius of 1.003 arcmin.

The galaxy is also a bright X-ray source, identified in 2000 by ROSAT Bright Source Catalogue and also by NRAO VLA Sky Survey. A study also found the X-ray peak is shown coinciding with the galaxy's position with the X-ray emission being centered on it. The associated X-ray component to the galaxy is found to have an extent parameter of 30 arcminutes and has X-ray luminosity of 6.92E+44 erg s^{-1}.
