= NGC 7241 =

Galaxy in the constellation Pegasus

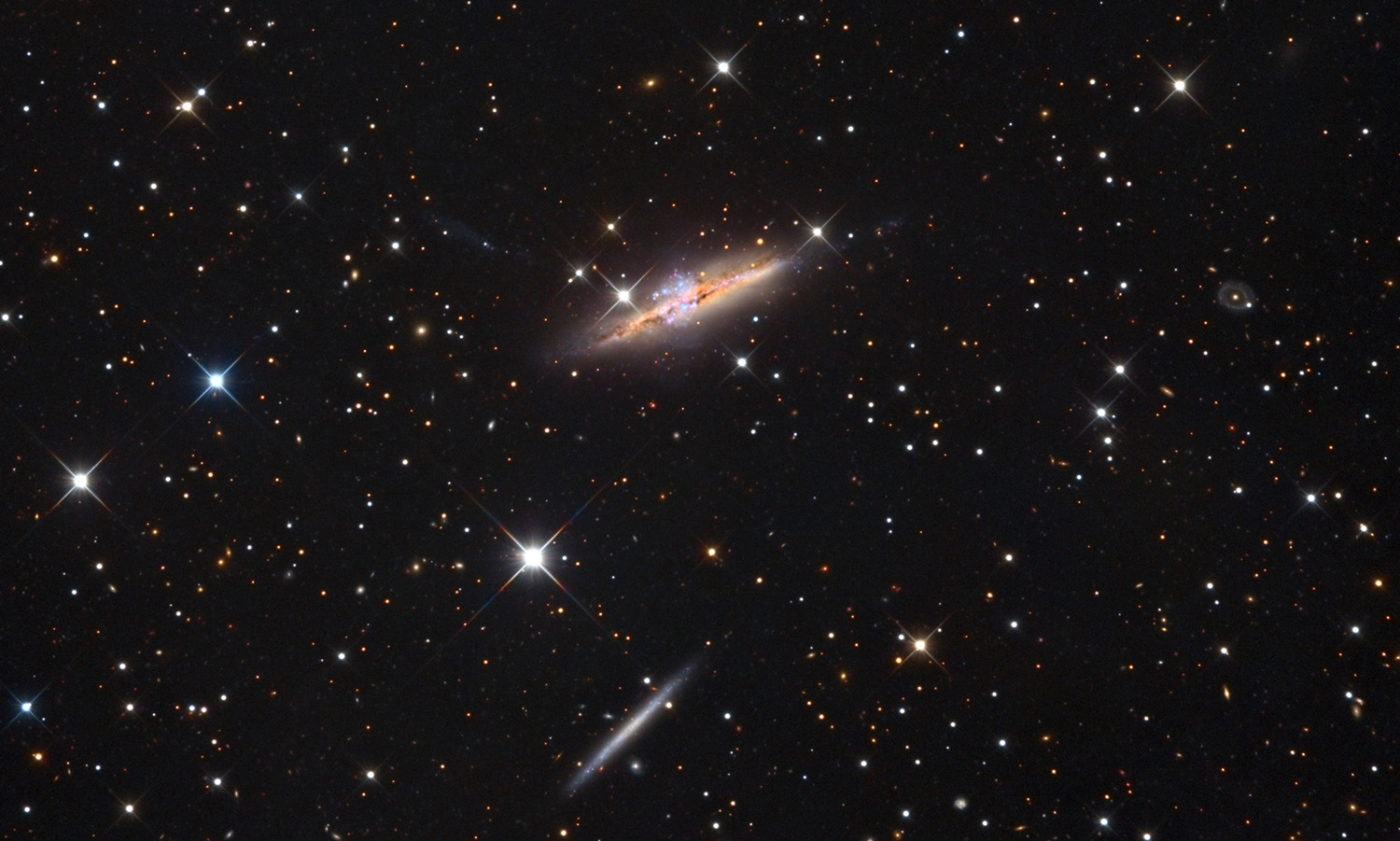
- NGC 7241 by the 32-inch Schulman Telescope at Mount Lemmon Observatory

Observation data (J2000 epoch)
- Constellation: Pegasus
- Right ascension: 22^{h} 15^{m} 49.8422^{s}
- Declination: +19° 13′ 57.83132″
- Redshift: 0.004960 ± 0.000002
- Heliocentric radial velocity: 1,487 ± 1 km/s
- Distance: 155 ± 61 Mly (47.7 ± 18.7 Mpc)
- Apparent magnitude (V): 12.7

Characteristics
- Type: SB(s)bc? pec
- Apparent size (V): 3.4′ × 1.1′

Other designations
- UGC 11968, II Zw 174, CGCG 451-024, MCG +03-56-020, PGC 68442

NGC 7241 is a barred spiral galaxy located in the constellation Pegasus. Based on redshift-independent methods, it is located at a distance of about 150 million light years from Earth, which, given its apparent dimensions, means that NGC 7241 is about 160,000 light years across. However, based on redshift the galaxy is about 70 million light years away. It was discovered by Édouard Stephan on August 28, 1872.

== Characteristics ==
NGC 7241 is a spiral galaxy that is seen edge-on. There is a slight warp in the dust lanes of the disk, better visible in infrared images, probably due to a past interaction with another galaxy. Based on its kinematics, the virial mass of NGC 7241 is 2.5×10^{12} M_{☉}. There is a smaller companion galaxy superimposed on the galactic disk near its center. The companion appears bluer than NGC 7241, indicating it contains younger stars.

A stellar stream extends towards the southeast of the galaxy, which coincides with a hydrogen tail. The hydrogen tail was detected by the Arecibo Telescope. There is a blob within the stream that could have been its source and it is undergoing star formation comparable to star forming dwarf galaxies near the edge of disk galaxies. The dwarf's mass is estimated to be about 6.4×10^{6} M_{☉} and 2.7×10^{8} M_{☉} which is one of the lowest reported for a stream progenitor outside the Local Group.

NGC 7241 forms a pair with disk galaxy UGC 11964. For a distance of 22.4 Mpc the project separation of the galaxies is 32.4 kpc.
