= JADES-GS-z7-01-QU =

Galaxy in the constellation Fornax

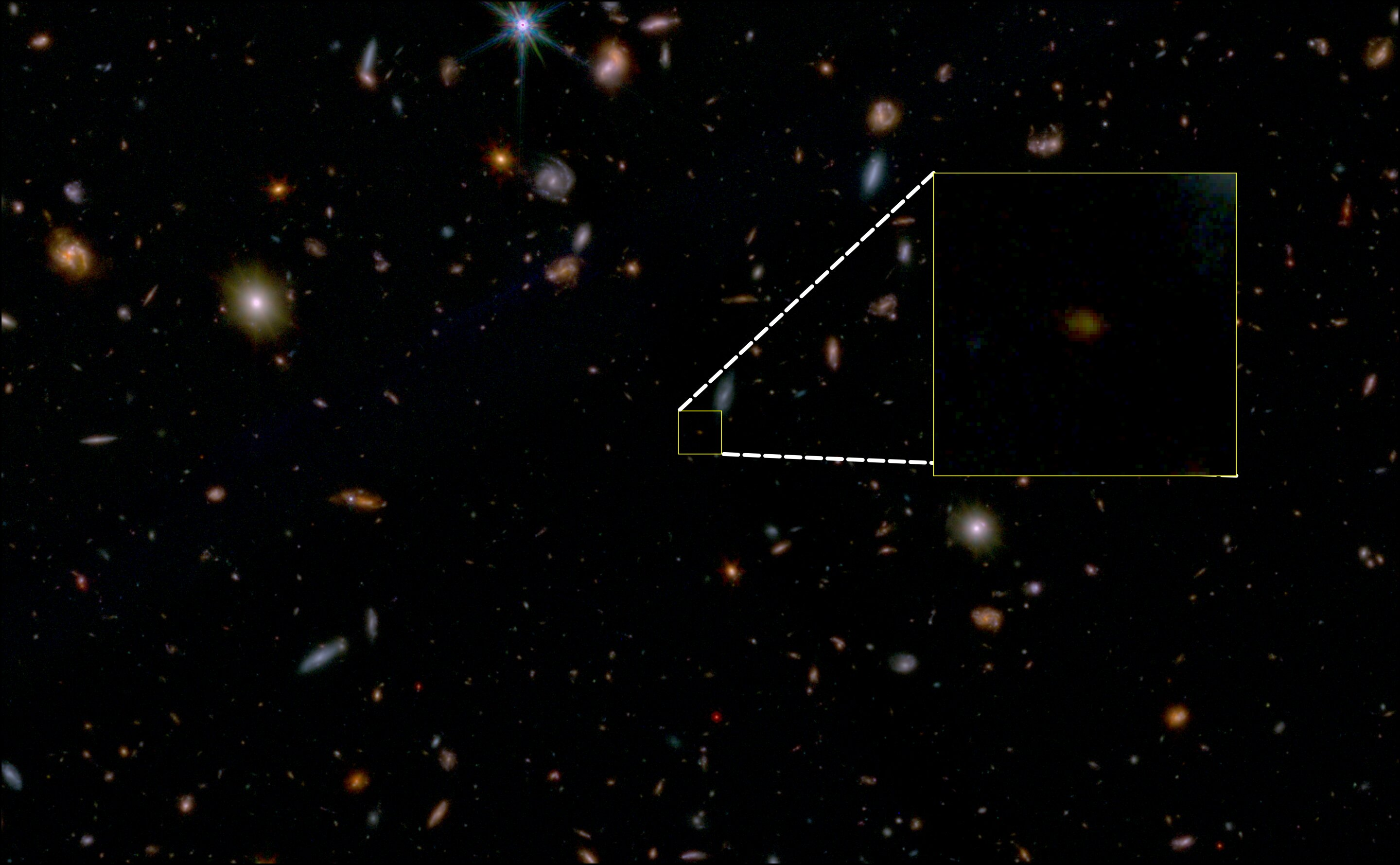
- JADES-GS-z7-01-QU shown in inset

Observation data (J2000 epoch)
- Constellation: Fornax
- Right ascension: 03^{h} 32^{m} 27.3^{s}
- Declination: −27° 48′ 6.81″
- Redshift: 7.29 ± 0.01

Characteristics
- Mass: 4×10^{8} to 6×10^{8} M_{☉}
- Half-light radius (physical): 650 light-years (200 pc)
- Notable features: Oldest and most distant "dead" galaxy so far discovered

Other designations
- JADES-GS+53.15508-27.80178

JADES-GS-z7-01-QU (also known as JADES-GS+53.15508-27.80178) is a Lyman-break galaxy, first identified in 2010, located in the constellation Fornax. It formed around 700 million years after the birth of the universe, after which it suddenly stopped creating new stars. It experienced rapid star formation around 80 million years before the epoch of observation, lasting for at least 30 million years, before ending around 10-20 million years before the epoch of observation. It is the oldest and most distant "dead" galaxy so far discovered.

== Discovery ==
It was first discovered in 2010 and identified as a Lyman-break galaxy using imaging by Oesch et al., but was too faint for spectroscopy observations – particularly at the rest-frame optical wavelengths necessary to confirm quiescence. In 2022, following the launch of the James Webb Space Telescope (JWST), the galaxy was observed with the JWST camera NIRCam and spectrograph NIRSpec/MSA as part of the JWST Advanced Deep Extragalactic Survey (JADES), which found it to be quenched (i.e., non star-forming) and with a relatively low stellar mass, around the same as the Small Magellanic Cloud (SMC).

== Properties ==
The JWST's NIRSpec observed it to have a very blue spectrum with a U-V colour of 0.16 ± 0.03 mag, a Balmer break, and no nebular emission lines.

== Implications ==
Usually, such quenching of star formation occurs either in very low-mass galaxies, or much later in the universe's timeline. However, the discovery implies that the current models of galaxy evolution may be incomplete or inaccurate.
