= Arp 187 =

Radio galaxy and merger remnant

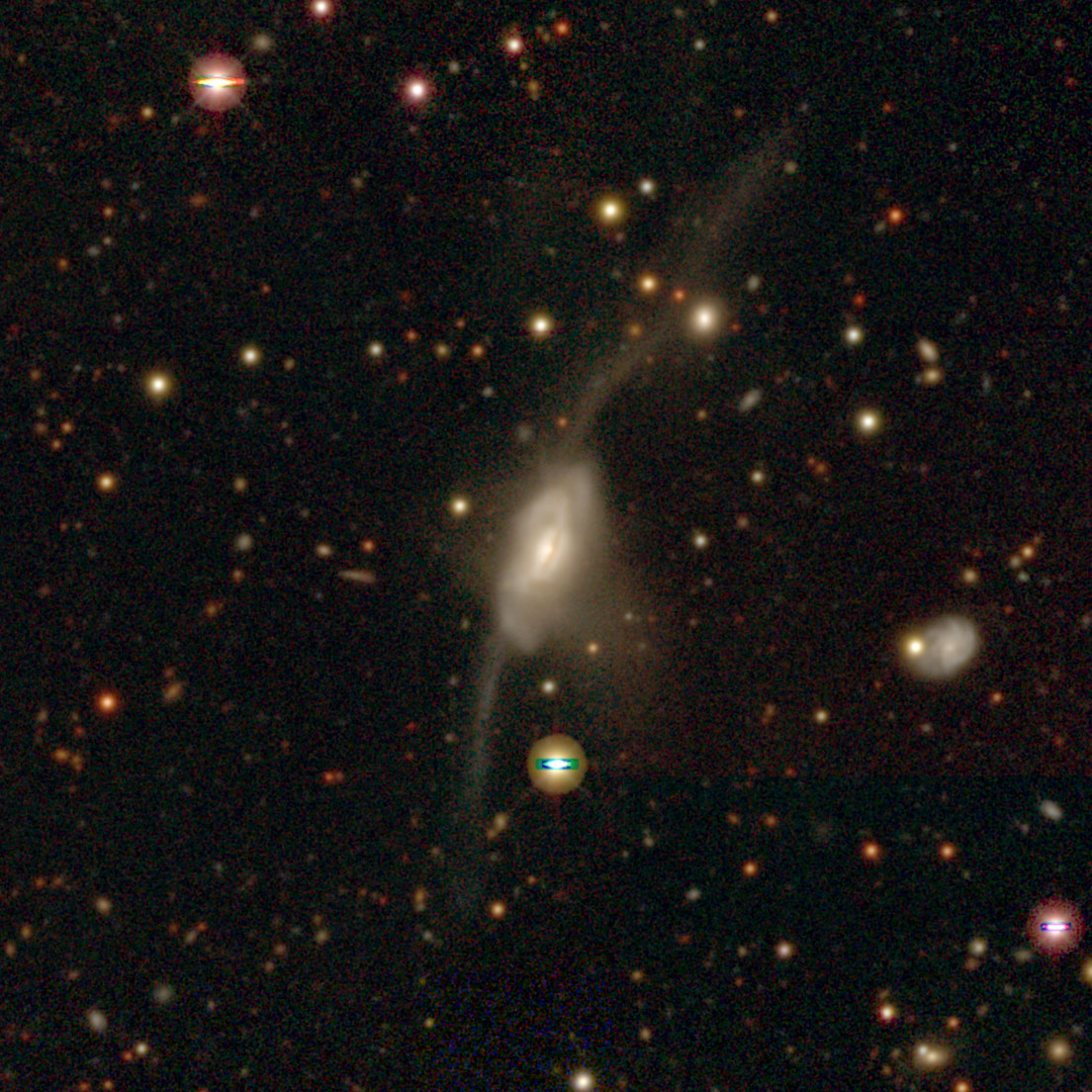
- Arp 187 by legacy surveys. The small galaxy to the right is LEDA 980468

Observation data (J2000 epoch)
- Constellation: Eridanus
- Right ascension: 5^{h} 03^{m} 53^{s}
- Declination: −10° 14′ 51″
- Redshift: 12095 ± 45 km/s
- Apparent magnitude (V): 15.3

Characteristics
- Type: Radio Galaxy
- Apparent size (V): 0.8 x 0.6

Other designations
- PGC 16691

Arp 187 is a radio galaxy and merger remnant located in the constellation Eridanus. It is an interacting galaxy pair (MCG-02-13-040). It is included in the Atlas of Peculiar Galaxies in the category galaxies with narrow filaments.

The galaxy has two prominent radio lobes, however the emission of its AGN in X-ray is low, and so is the thermal output of the AGN torus as observed in infrared, suggesting that it has been quenched. The detection of a narrow line region (with dimensions up to 10 kpc) with still active emission mean that the AGN was still active up to at least 10^{4-5} years ago. In the nucleus of Arp 187 is predicted to lie a supermassive black hole (SMBH) with estimated mass around 6.7 × 10^{8} M_{☉}. Further observations of such a SMBH with a quenched AGN were published in 2019.
