= Pokhozhaev's identity =

Pokhozhaev's identity is an integral relation satisfied by stationary localized solutions to a nonlinear Schrödinger equation or nonlinear Klein–Gordon equation. It was obtained by S.I. Pokhozhaev and is similar to the virial theorem. This relation is also known as G.H. Derrick's theorem. Similar identities can be derived for other equations of mathematical physics.

== The Pokhozhaev identity for the stationary nonlinear Schrödinger equation ==
Here is a general form due to H. Berestycki and P.-L. Lions.

Let $g(s)$ be continuous and real-valued, with $g(0)=0$. Denote $G(s)=\int_0^s g(t)\,dt$. Let

$$u\in L^\infty_{\mathrm{loc}}(\R^n),
\qquad
\nabla u\in L^2(\R^n),
\qquad
G(u)\in L^1(\R^n),
\qquad
n\in\N,$$

be a solution to the equation

$$-\nabla^2 u=g(u)$$,

in the sense of distributions. Then $u$ satisfies the relation

$$\frac{n-2}{2}\int_{\R^n}|\nabla u(x)|^2\,dx=n\int_{\R^n}G(u(x))\,dx.$$

== The Pokhozhaev identity for the stationary nonlinear Dirac equation ==
There is a form of the virial identity for the stationary nonlinear Dirac equation in three spatial dimensions (and also the Maxwell-Dirac equations) and in arbitrary spatial dimension. Let $n\in\N,\,N\in\N$ and let $\alpha^i,\,1\le i\le n$ and $\beta$ be the self-adjoint Dirac matrices of size $N\times N$:

$$\alpha^i\alpha^j+\alpha^j\alpha^i=2\delta_{ij}I_N,
\quad
\beta^2=I_N,
\quad
\alpha^i\beta+\beta\alpha^i=0,
\quad
1\le i,j\le n.$$

Let $D_0=-\mathrm{i}\alpha\cdot\nabla=-\mathrm{i}\sum_{i=1}^n\alpha^i\frac{\partial}{\partial x^i}$ be the massless Dirac operator. Let $g(s)$ be continuous and real-valued, with $g(0)=0$. Denote $G(s)=\int_0^s g(t)\,dt$. Let $\phi\in L^\infty_{\mathrm{loc}}(\R^n,\C^N)$ be a spinor-valued solution that satisfies the stationary form of the nonlinear Dirac equation,

$$\omega\phi=D_0\phi+g(\phi^\ast\beta\phi)\beta\phi,$$

in the sense of distributions, with some $\omega\in\R$. Assume that

$$\phi\in H^1(\R^n,\C^N),\qquad
G(\phi^\ast\beta\phi)\in L^1(\R^n).$$

Then $\phi$ satisfies the relation

$$\omega\int_{\R^n}\phi(x)^\ast\phi(x)\,dx
=\frac{n-1}{n}\int_{\R^n}\phi(x)^\ast D_0\phi(x)\,dx
+\int_{\R^n}G(\phi(x)^\ast\beta\phi(x))\,dx.$$

== See also ==
- Virial theorem
- Derrick's theorem
