= Vakhitov–Kolokolov stability criterion =

The Vakhitov–Kolokolov stability criterion is a condition for linear stability (sometimes called spectral stability) of solitary wave solutions to a wide class of U(1)-invariant Hamiltonian systems, named after Soviet scientists Aleksandr Kolokolov (Александр Александрович Колоколов) and Nazib Vakhitov (Назиб Галиевич Вахитов). The condition for linear stability of a solitary wave $u(x,t) = \phi_\omega(x)e^{-i\omega t}$ with frequency $\omega$ has the form

$$\frac{d}{d\omega}Q(\omega)<0,$$

where $Q(\omega)\,$ is the charge (or momentum) of the solitary wave $\phi_\omega(x)e^{-i\omega t}$, conserved by Noether's theorem due to U(1)-invariance of the system.

== Original formulation ==
Originally, this criterion was obtained for the nonlinear Schrödinger equation,

$$i\frac{\partial}{\partial t}u(x,t)= -\frac{\partial^2}{\partial x^2} u(x,t) +g(|u(x,t)|^2)u(x,t),$$

where $x \in \R$, $t \in \R$, and $g \in C^\infty(\R)$ is a smooth real-valued function. The solution $u(x,t)$ is assumed to be complex-valued. Since the equation is U(1)-invariant, by Noether's theorem, it has an integral of motion, $Q(u) = \frac{1}{2} \int_{\R}|u(x,t)|^2\,dx$, which is called charge or momentum, depending on the model under consideration. For a wide class of functions $g$, the nonlinear Schrödinger equation admits solitary wave solutions of the form $u(x,t) = \phi_\omega(x)e^{-i\omega t}$, where $\omega \in \R$ and $\phi_\omega(x)$ decays for large $x$ (one often requires that $\phi_\omega(x)$ belongs to the Sobolev space $H^1(\R^n)$). Usually such solutions exist for $\omega$ from an interval or collection of intervals of a real line. The Vakhitov–Kolokolov stability criterion,

$$\frac{d}{d\omega}Q(\phi_\omega)<0,$$

is a condition of spectral stability of a solitary wave solution. Namely, if this condition is satisfied at a particular value of $\omega$, then the linearization at the solitary wave with this $\omega$ has no spectrum in the right half-plane.

This result is based on an earlier work by Vladimir Zakharov.

== Generalizations ==
This result has been generalized to abstract Hamiltonian systems with U(1)-invariance. It was shown that under rather general conditions the Vakhitov–Kolokolov stability criterion guarantees not only spectral stability but also orbital stability of solitary waves.

The stability condition has been generalized to traveling wave solutions to the generalized Korteweg–de Vries equation of the form

$$\partial_t u + \partial_x^3 u +  \partial_x f(u) = 0\,$$.

The stability condition has also been generalized to Hamiltonian systems with a more general symmetry group.

== See also ==
- Derrick's theorem
- Linear stability
- Lyapunov stability
- Nonlinear Schrödinger equation
- Orbital stability
