= GS-9209 (galaxy) =

Massive galaxy with no star formation

Observation data
- Constellation: Fornax
- Right ascension: 03^{h} 32^{m} 25.96^{s}
- Declination: −27° 49′ 30.44″
- Redshift: 4.658
- Distance: 13 billion light years (Light travel distance); 25 billion light years (Present proper distance)

Characteristics
- Type: quiescent galaxy
- Number of stars: 3.8×10^10

GS-9209 is a massive Quiescent galaxy (Note: quiescent galaxy: a galaxy that is no longer forming stars) located in the constellation Fornax at a redshift of 4.658 or at a comoving distance of 25 billion light years. It has a stellar mass of 3.8×10^{10} solar masses (7.6×10^{40} kg; 1.67×10^{41} lb) which is roughly 10 times the mass of the Milky Way galaxy.

When the universe was around 800 million years old, the star formation rate (SFR) in the GS-9209 galaxy has undergone a sharp decrease. Most of the stars that exist in this galaxy have formed over a 200 million year period when the universe was 600-800 million years old.
