= MACS 2129-1 =

Dead disk galaxy

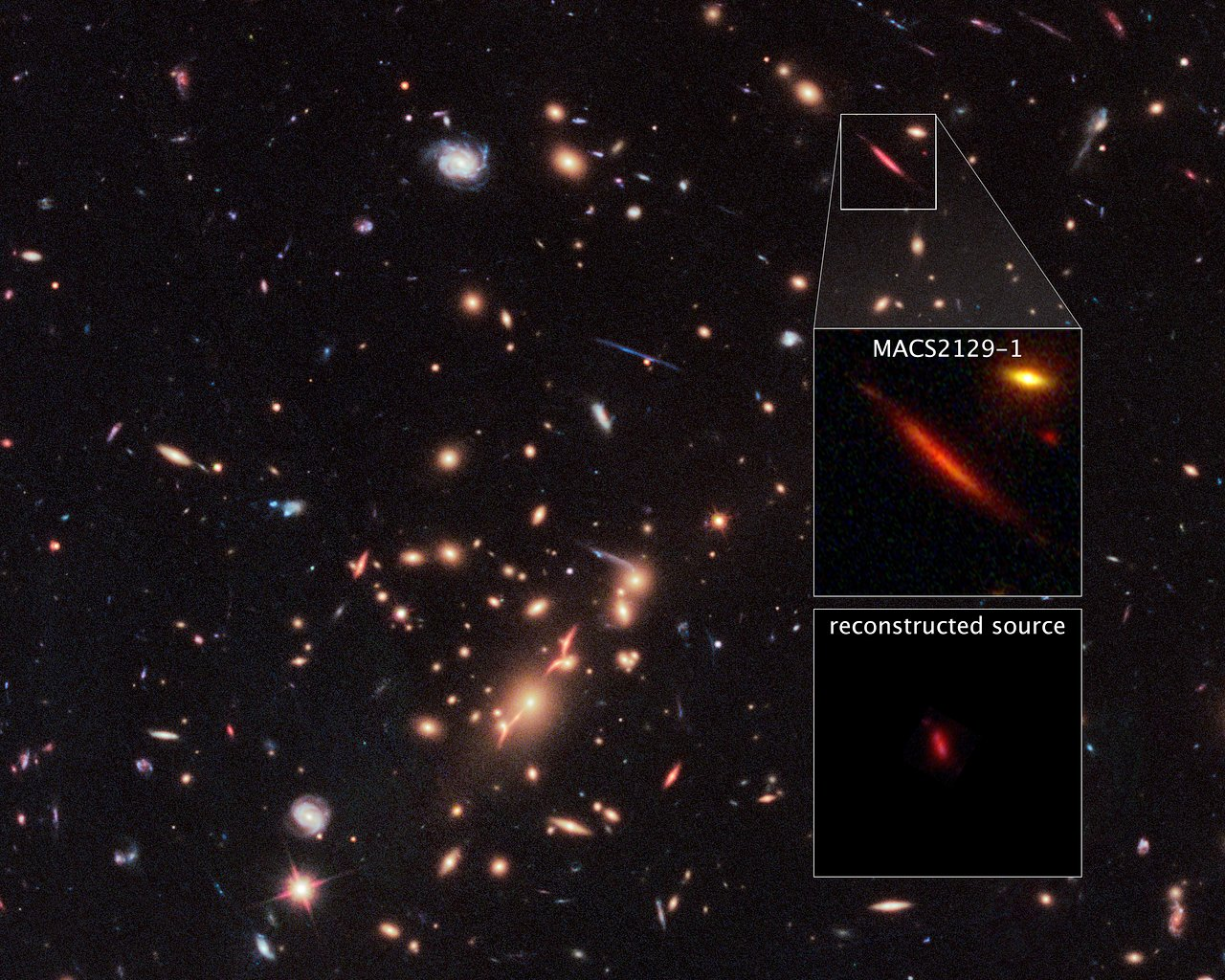
- Image of MACS 2129-1 as seen by the Hubble Space Telescope.

Observation data (J2000 epoch)
- Constellation: Aquarius
- Right ascension: 21^{h} 29^{m} 22.20^{s}
- Declination: −07° 41′ 31.2″
- Redshift: 2.15
- Heliocentric radial velocity: 244,898 km/s
- Distance: ~ 10 billion ly (3.1 billion pc) (light travel distance); 18 billion ly (5.5 billion pc) (present proper distance)
- Apparent magnitude (V): 23.8

Characteristics
- Type: Disc galaxy
- Size: ~50,000 ly (diameter)

Other designations
- [GRM2013] MACS J2129-0741 1

MACS 2129-1 is an early universe so-called 'dead' disk galaxy discovered in 2017 by the Hubble Space Telescope from NASA. It appears approximately 10 billion light-years away from Earth (current distance 18 billion light years). MACS 2129-1 has been described as 'dead' as it has ceased making new stars.

== See also ==
- List of galaxies
