= Linear stability =

State of linear equations

In mathematics, in the theory of differential equations and dynamical systems, a particular stationary or quasistationary solution to a nonlinear system is called linearly unstable if the linearization of the equation at this solution has the form $dr/dt = A r$, where r is the perturbation to the steady state, A is a linear operator whose spectrum contains eigenvalues with positive real part. If all the eigenvalues have negative real part, then the solution is called linearly stable. Other names for linear stability include exponential stability or stability in terms of first approximation. If there exists an eigenvalue with zero real part then the question about stability cannot be solved on the basis of the first approximation and we approach the so-called "centre and focus problem".

== Examples ==
=== Ordinary differential equation ===
The differential equation
$$\frac{dx}{dt} = x - x^2$$
has two stationary (time-independent) solutions: x = 0 and x = 1. The linearization at x = 0 has the form $\frac{dx}{dt}=x$. The linearized operator is A_{0} = 1. The only eigenvalue is $\lambda=1$. The solutions to this equation grow exponentially; the stationary point x = 0 is linearly unstable.

To derive the linearization at x = 1, one writes $\frac{dr}{dt} = (1+r)-(1+r)^2 = -r-r^2$, where r = x − 1. The linearized equation is then $\frac{dr}{dt} = -r$; the linearized operator is A_{1} = −1, the only eigenvalue is $\lambda=-1$, hence this stationary point is linearly stable.

=== Nonlinear Schrödinger Equation ===
The nonlinear Schrödinger equation
$$i\frac{\partial u}{\partial t}
= -\frac{\partial^2 u}{\partial x^2} - |u|^{2k} u,$$
where u(x,t) ∈ C and k > 0, has solitary wave solutions of the form $\phi(x) e^{-i\omega t}$. To derive the linearization at a solitary wave, one considers the solution in the form $u(x,t) = (\phi(x)+r(x,t)) e^{-i\omega t}$. The linearized equation on $r(x,t)$ is given by
$$\frac{\partial}{\partial t}\begin{bmatrix}\text{Re}\,r\\ \text{Im} \,r\end{bmatrix}=
A
\begin{bmatrix}\text{Re}\,r \\ \text{Im} \,r\end{bmatrix},$$
where
$$A = \begin{bmatrix} 0 &L_0 \\ -L_1 & 0 \end{bmatrix},$$
with
$$L_0 = -\frac{\partial}{\partial x^2} - k\phi^2-\omega$$
and
$$L_1 = -\frac{\partial}{\partial x^2} - (2k+1) \phi^2-\omega$$
the differential operators. According to Vakhitov–Kolokolov stability criterion, when k > 2, the spectrum of A has positive point eigenvalues, so that the linearized equation is linearly (exponentially) unstable; for 0 < k ≤ 2, the spectrum of A is purely imaginary, so that the corresponding solitary waves are linearly stable.

It should be mentioned that linear stability does not automatically imply stability; in particular, when k = 2, the solitary waves are unstable. On the other hand, for 0 < k < 2, the solitary waves are not only linearly stable but also orbitally stable.

== See also ==
- Asymptotic stability
- Linearization (stability analysis)
- Lyapunov stability
- Orbital stability
- Stability theory
- Vakhitov–Kolokolov stability criterion
