= Orbital stability =

Solution to a partial differential equation which remains close to the initial data

In mathematical physics and the theory of partial differential equations, the solitary wave solution of the form $u(x,t)=e^{-i\omega t}\phi(x)$ is said to be orbitally stable if any solution with the initial data sufficiently close to $\phi(x)$ forever remains in a given small neighborhood of the trajectory of $e^{-i\omega t}\phi(x).$

== Formal definition ==
Formal definition is as follows. Consider the dynamical system

$$i\frac{du}{dt}=A(u),
\qquad
u(t)\in X,
\quad t\in\R,$$

with $X$ a Banach space over $\Complex$, and $A : X \to X$. We assume that the system is $\mathrm{U}(1)$-invariant, so that $A(e^{is}u) = e^{is}A(u)$ for any $u\in X$ and any $s\in\R$.

Assume that $\omega \phi=A(\phi)$, so that $u(t)=e^{-i\omega t}\phi$ is a solution to the dynamical system. We call such solution a solitary wave.

We say that the solitary wave $e^{-i\omega t}\phi$ is orbitally stable if for any $\epsilon > 0$ there is $\delta > 0$ such that for any $v_0\in X$ with $\Vert \phi-v_0\Vert_X < \delta$ there is a solution $v(t)$ defined for all $t\ge 0$ such that $v(0) = v_0$, and such that this solution satisfies

$$\sup_{t\ge 0} \inf_{s\in\R} \Vert v(t) - e^{is} \phi \Vert_X < \epsilon.$$

== Example ==
According to , the solitary wave solution $e^{-i\omega t}\phi_\omega(x)$ to the nonlinear Schrödinger equation

$$i\frac{\partial}{\partial t} u = -\frac{\partial^2}{\partial x^2} u+g\!\left(|u|^2\right)u,
\qquad
u(x,t)\in\Complex,\quad x\in\R,\quad t\in\R,$$

where $g$ is a smooth real-valued function, is orbitally stable if the Vakhitov–Kolokolov stability criterion is satisfied:

$$\frac{d}{d\omega}Q(\phi_\omega) < 0,$$

where

$$Q(u) = \frac{1}{2} \int_{\R} |u(x,t)|^2 \, dx$$

is the charge of the solution $u(x,t)$, which is conserved in time (at least if the solution $u(x,t)$ is sufficiently smooth).

It was also shown, that if $\frac{d}{d\omega}Q(\omega) < 0$ at a particular value of $\omega$, then the solitary wave $e^{-i\omega t}\phi_\omega(x)$ is Lyapunov stable, with the Lyapunov function given by $L(u) = E(u) - \omega Q(u) + \Gamma(Q(u)-Q(\phi_\omega))^2$, where $E(u) = \frac{1}{2} \int_{\R} \left(\left|\frac{\partial u}{\partial x}\right|^2 + G\!\left(|u|^2\right)\right) dx$ is the energy of a solution $u(x,t)$, with $G(y) = \int_0^y g(z)\,dz$ the antiderivative of $g$, as long as the constant $\Gamma>0$ is chosen sufficiently large.

== See also ==
- Stability theory
  - Asymptotic stability
  - Linear stability
  - Lyapunov stability
  - Vakhitov−Kolokolov stability criterion
