= Quenching (astronomy) =

Phenomenon whereby a galaxy shuts down its star formation

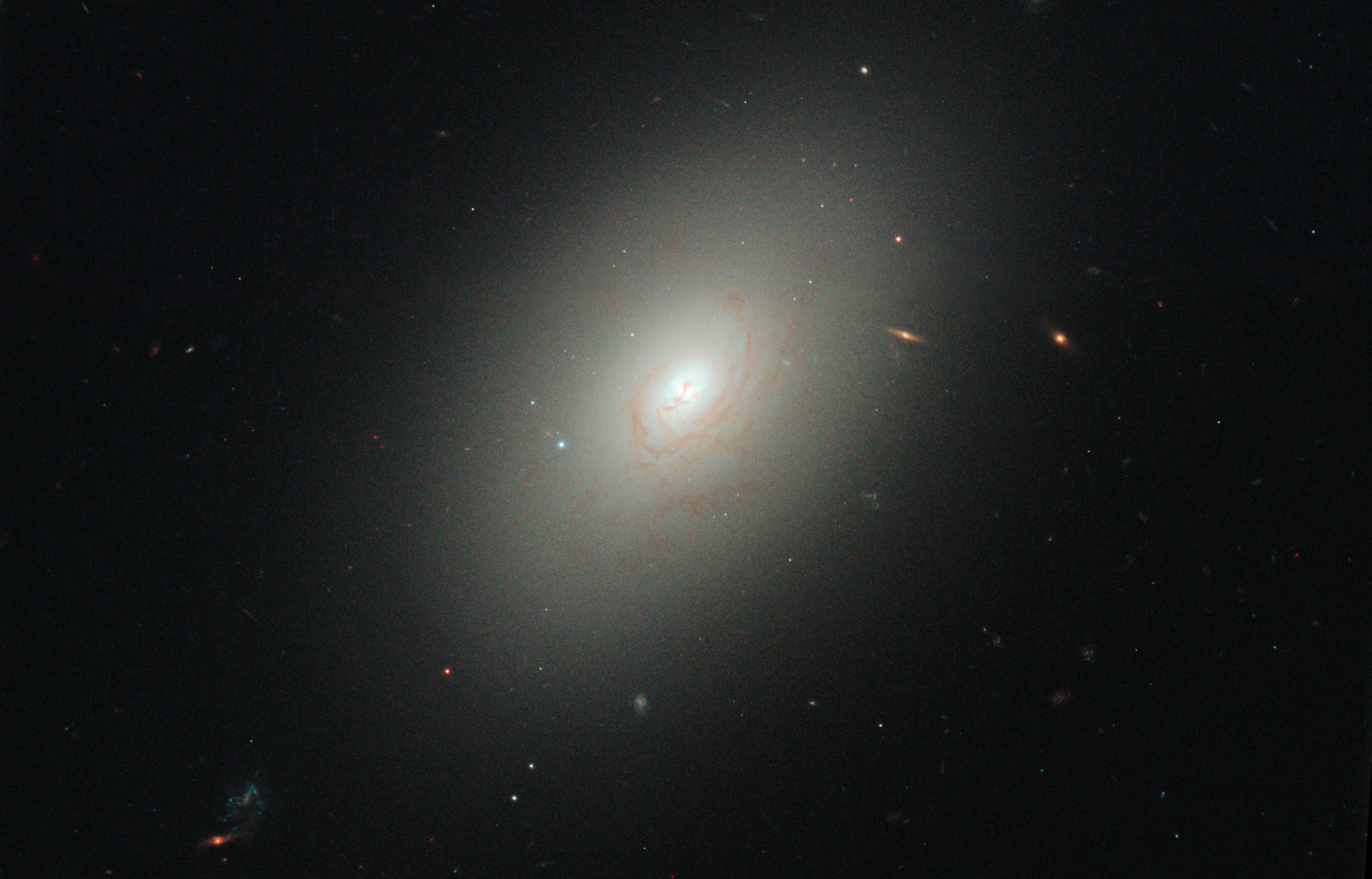
NGC 4150, a quiescent elliptical galaxy in the constellation Coma Berenices

In astronomy, quenching refers to the shutting-down of star formation within a galaxy. A galaxy where star formation has quenched is known as a quenched or quiescent galaxy. Quenching is an important phenomenon in the study of galaxy evolution, as all galaxies can be divided into two fundamental types: actively star-forming or quenched.

Compared to a star-forming counterpart, a quenched galaxy tends to be redder in the visible spectrum and contain older stellar populations, a direct consequence of its star formation being shut off. Most elliptical and lenticular galaxies known to date have these features, which, along with their weak star formation, qualify them as quiescent. Additionally, quenched galaxies also exist in more massive dark matter halos and can be found in denser environments, such as clusters or groups.

Until recently, most quenched galaxies have been found in the local Universe. Since the late 2010s, deep-field surveys in near-infrared bands, including some by the James Webb Space Telescope, have found a number of quenched galaxies in the early Universe. Various mechanisms have been proposed as drivers of quenching, but their relevance depends on the age, mass, and environmental conditions of each quenched galaxy. These mechanisms can be divided into two classes based on their origins: internal (coming from within the galaxy being quenched) and environmental (coming from surrounding galaxies). Internal mechanisms, most notably active galactic nucleus (AGN) feedback, are responsible for most of the quenching seen in high-mass galaxies, while environmental mechanisms contribute to the quenching of low-mass galaxies, especially if said galaxies are satellites around a more massive central galaxy.

== Quenching threshold ==
The quenching threshold is the threshold of star formation above which a galaxy is considered star forming, and below which it is quenched. This shows up in large surveys of the Universe, where galaxies will generally display a bi-modality, with distinct populations of blue, star-forming galaxies versus red, quenched ones. To quantify this bi-modality, astronomers use ${sSFR}$, the specific star formation rate of a galaxy, which can be defined simply as:

$sSFR = {SFR \over M_*}$

where $SFR$ is the total star formation rate, measured in solar masses per year, and $M_*$ is the total stellar mass, measured in solar masses. This allows astronomers to compare the star formation rate in galaxies of different masses more accurately. A rigid definition of quenching in the local Universe sets the quenching threshold at $sSFR < 10^{-11}$.

The Cosmic Cliffs, an active star-forming region in NGC 3324. Across cosmic time, star formation rates in our modern Universe are actually much lower than previous epochs.

However, in the grand scheme of cosmic history, the picture becomes more complicated. Across cosmic time, the star formation rate and stellar mass of galaxies have evolved significantly. For example, the Universe is theorized to have had elevated rates of star formation around two to three billion years after the Big Bang, a period also known as "Cosmic Noon". This is unlike our current epoch, which is called "Cosmic Twilight" as today's galaxies are forming stars at much lower rates. To accommodate for these evolving galaxy properties across different epochs, the quenching threshold has also been defined in more flexible terms. One such definition parameterizes the threshold as:

$sSFR = {0.2 \over t_H(z)}$

where $t_H$ is the age of the Universe, and depends on the corresponding redshift $z$ at that epoch. With this definition, a massive galaxy in the early Universe like GS-9209, with $sSFR=10^{-10.3}$, can be classified as quenched, because at its redshift, the quenching threshold is actually $sSFR < 10^{-9.8}$.

== Internal quenching ==
=== Active galactic nucleus (AGN) feedback ===
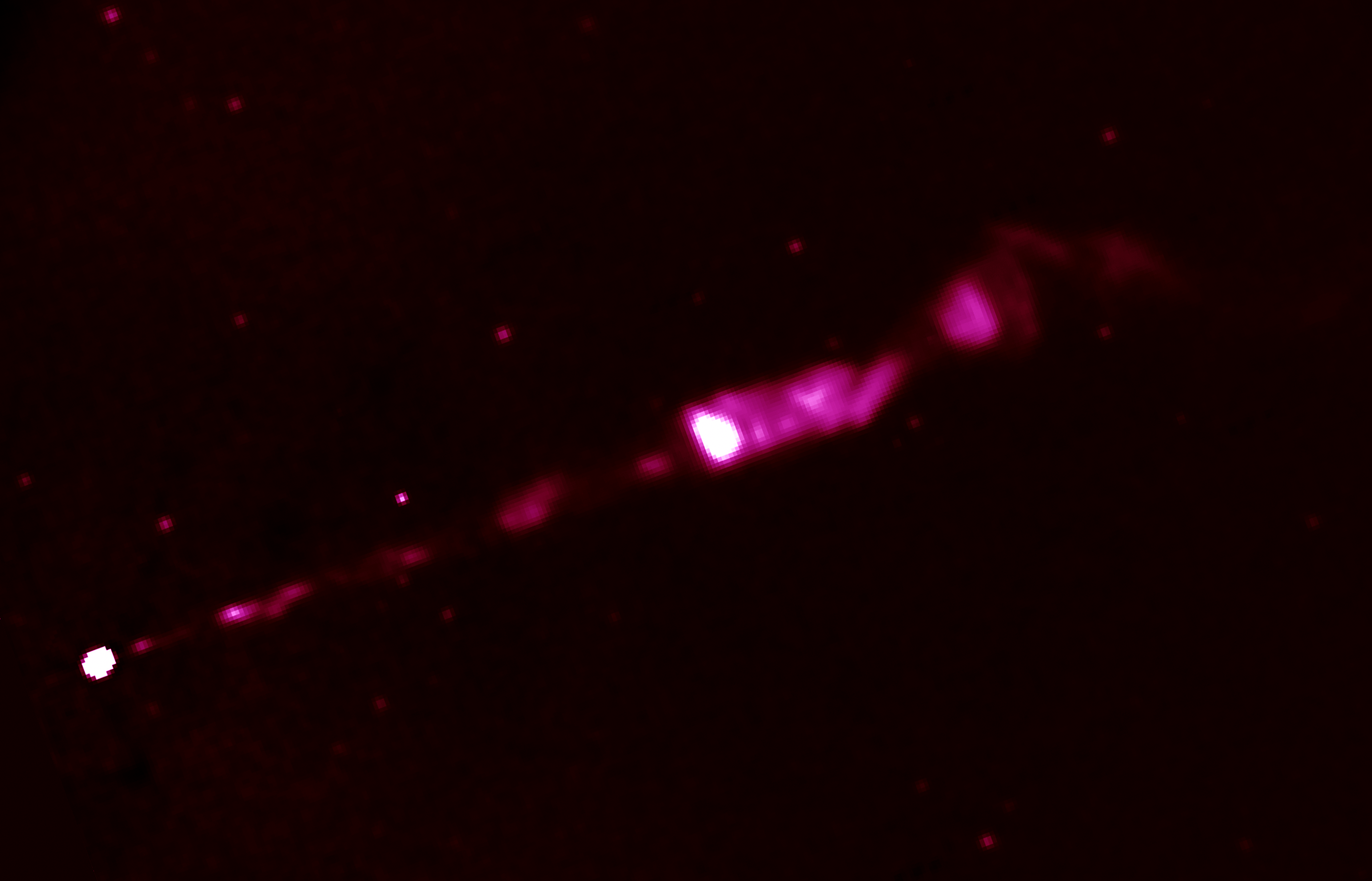
The astrophysical jet of M87. Astrophysical jets are a type of active galactic nucleus (AGN) feedback that can heat up previously cold gas and prevent quenching.

The most prominent driver of quenching in a galaxy is feedback from its active galactic nucleus (AGN). When gas and dust spiral towards a supermassive black hole inside an AGN, this process can release a lot of energy and heat up the gas of the entire galaxy, which takes away the amount of cold gas that the galaxy needs for star formation.

In cosmological simulations such as Illustris, quenching can only happen in massive galaxies when there is some type of AGN-driven heating. There are at least two scenarios by which an AGN can heat up gas in a galaxy. In one scenario, a lot of gas accretes onto the AGN at once, which leads to violent feedback, including astrophysical jets, which can heat up entire galaxies at a rapid pace. This is known as the "quasar mode". In another scenario called the "preventative mode", the heating occurs in a slower, less violent way: the AGN provides energy that prevents cold gas from accreting in the interstellar medium, which over time will reduce star formation. Observations of the local Universe have shown that both pathways can lead to the heating of cold gas, and eventually quenching. Simulations also show that high redshift galaxies were primarily quenched through AGN feedback.

=== Shock heating ===
Another mechanism for quenching is shock heating, which begins when intergalactic gas falls into a galaxy's dark matter halo at a rate much faster than the local speed of sound. This creates a shock that not only halts the in-falling material, but also generates a hot, virialized halo of gas which propagates towards the virial radius (the radius of the dark matter halo itself) and, in some cases, can extend even further than said radius. Under the effect of this hot medium, the cold gas in the galaxy can be heated up, thus preventing star formation.

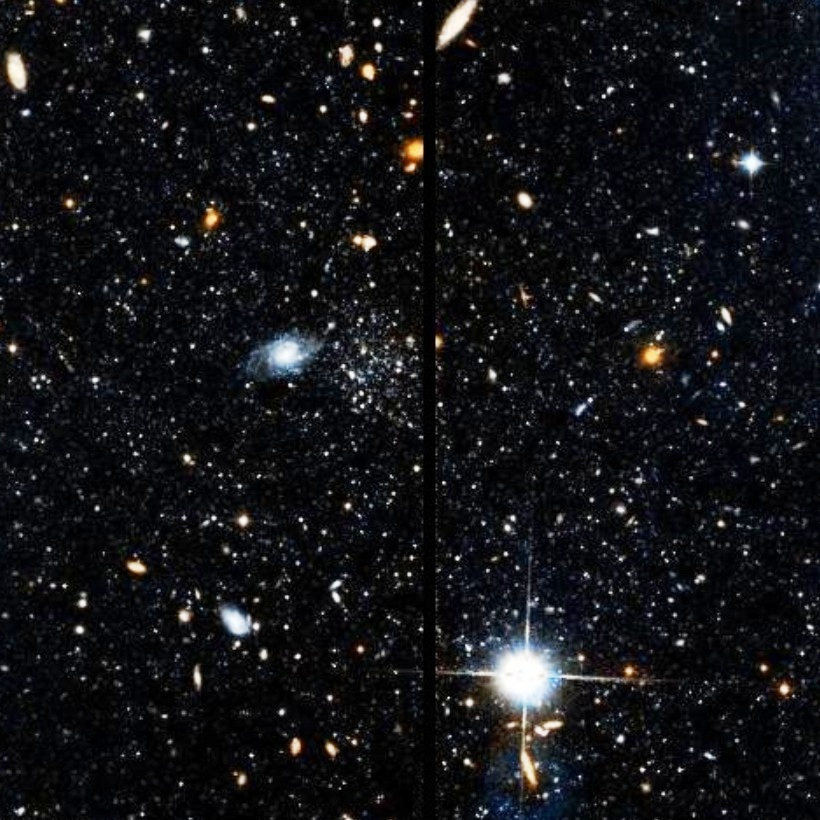
Eridanus II, a dwarf galaxy quenched solely by supernova feedback

Shock heating is not possible across all ranges of galaxy halo mass, but is restricted to halos with masses above 10^{12} solar masses. This is because at lower masses, the gas pressure generated by the shock is curtailed by radiative cooling and cannot prevent the shock from gravitational collapse. Moreover, even in cases where the shock is supported and successfully generates a hot medium, there may still be gas filaments within the halo that are too cold and dense to be heated up. These filaments will provide critical gas supply to the post-shock galaxy, which is now dominated by the hot medium. In such scenarios, a full quenching of the galaxy will require supplementary factors, including AGN feedback.

=== Other mechanisms ===
There are additional processes within a galaxy that can contribute to its quenching in limited cases. One such process is supernovae, which can indeed heat up cold gas but is too weak to singlehandedly quench galaxies inside massive dark matter halos. However, in the case of ultra-faint dwarf galaxy Eridanus II, whose halo is only 10^{7} solar masses, supernova feedback alone has been shown to be capable of driving out star-forming gas, thereby quenching the system.

== Environmental quenching ==
=== Mergers ===
A merging event between two star-forming galaxies can create a quenched galaxy. In this scenario, the merger drastically alters the morphology of the galaxies, thus redistributing their material and causing a starburst. This starburst then quickly uses up the cold gas reservoir and leaves behind a single galaxy with reduced star formation rates. In addition, if the merging galaxies host an AGN, the starburst can also feed that AGN, which heats up any remaining cold gas and results in a completely quenched elliptical galaxy. While simulations have shown that mergers are likely to result in a quiescent galaxy, this method of quenching is responsible for only a small fraction of quiescent galaxies at low redshift.

=== Galaxy-galaxy interactions ===
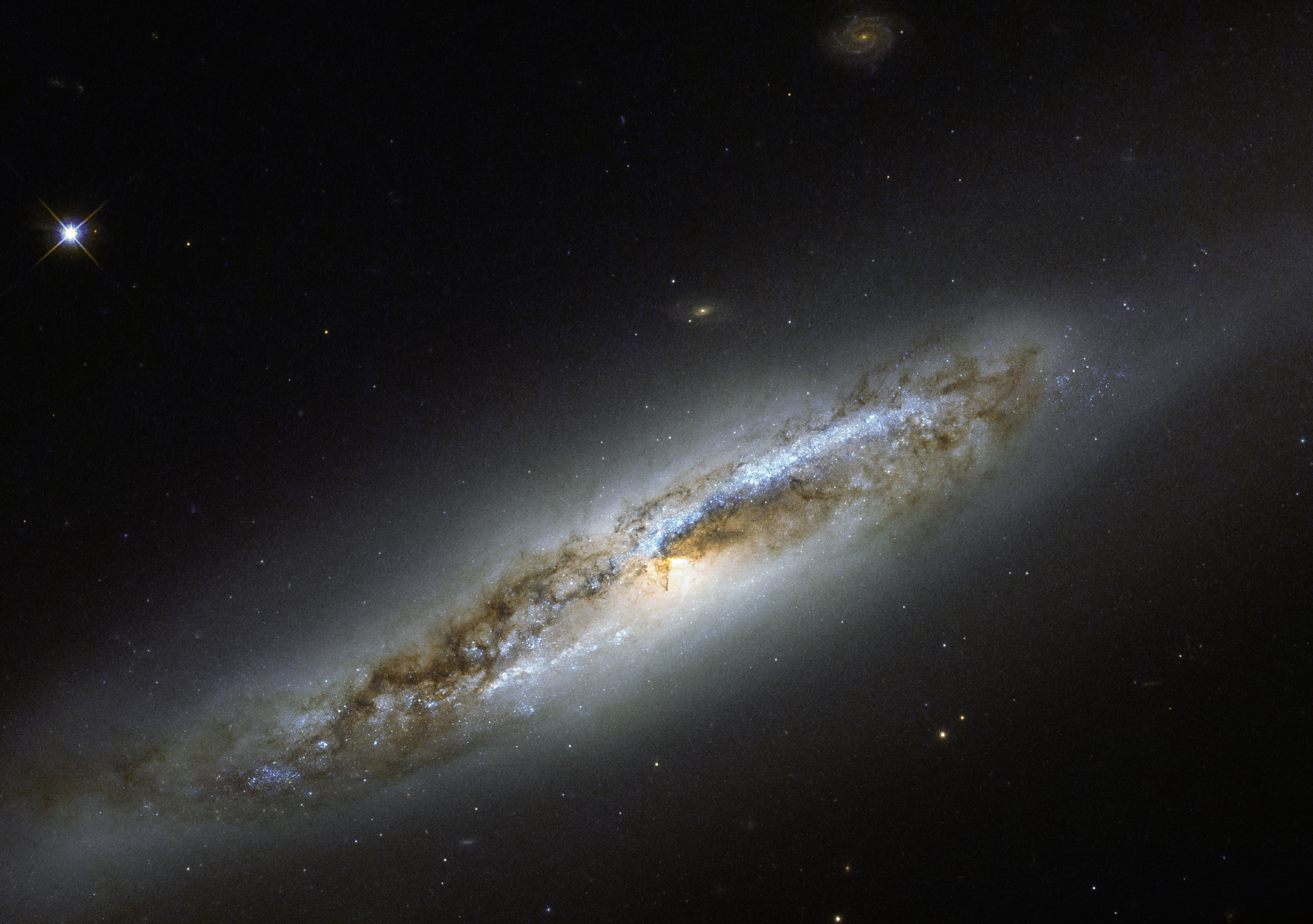
NGC 4388, a spiral galaxy whose reduced star formation rate is due to ram pressure stripping as it passes through the Virgo Cluster

In the case of low-mass dwarf galaxies, quenching is also caused by interactions that do not require galaxies merging as one. One such phenomenon is ram pressure stripping, which happens when a dwarf galaxy passes through the dense, hot medium in the center of a galaxy cluster. Acting as a fluid, this intracluster medium will exert a drag force surpassing the gravitational potential of the passing galaxy and remove its gas through elongated tails. Ram pressure stripping has been observed in clusters like Virgo. Cosmological simulations show that this procedure has a rapid timescale of 200 million years, and can take out all the gas in dwarf galaxies whose stellar mass is less than 10^{7} solar masses.

Another mechanism involves a cutoff of the gas supply that comes from the hot corona around a dwarf galaxy. In theory, the gas in this corona can cool off, fall into the galactic disk, and fuel star formation. However, as the galaxy passes through a dense environment, ram pressure can remove this hot gas from the galaxy at a slower pace than stripping. As a result, the gas supply will be cut off over a prolonged period of a few billion years. This phenomenon has multiple names in the literature, including slow quenching, starvation, and strangulation.

Dwarf galaxies can also lose gas via harassment. This is when a galaxy falls into the center of a cluster and experiences frequent high-speed close encounters with the galaxies therein. Disturbed by these encounters, the in-falling galaxy can change shape and redistribute its material (much like the merger case), leading to a starburst that eventually drains it of its gas contents.

==== Criticisms of language use ====
The application of words like stripping, starvation, strangulation, and harassment to galactic mechanisms has been criticized among astronomers for its unnecessary connotations of domestic and gender-based violence. Additionally, terms like starvation and strangulation are seen as inaccurate, because the human processes that they originally describe often lead to death, while the dwarf galaxies that undergo these phenomena do not "die", but simply form stars at a more reduced rate.

== Mini-Quenching ==
Sometimes, galaxies can be temporarily quenched, in a process called mini-quenching. Galaxies with masses between $10^7-10^9 M_\odot$can be mini-quenched through the same processes as fully quenched galaxies, both environmental and internal. Unlike quenched galaxies, mini-quenched galaxies experience starburst events post-mini-quench. This can also be described as having bursty star formation.

At very high redshifts ($z>7$), it is estimated that 1 in every 35 non-quiescent galaxies may be mini-quenched. A correlation has also been observed between the size of galaxies and their likelihood of being mini-quenched, as less massive and less luminous galaxies have higher rates of mini-quenching.

== Terminology ==
Other than quenched or quiescent, a galaxy that has shut down its star formation can also be called passive or early-type. The latter description came from the Hubble tuning-fork diagram, where ellipticals and lenticulars, which are typically quenched, are placed on the left side, hence their classification as early (as opposed to late-type spiral galaxies, which are on the right side). There are misconceptions that Edwin Hubble arranged the diagram and named the galaxy types in such ways because he thought early-type ellipticals would evolve into late-type spirals; however, he had warned in a paper from 1927 that the positioning on the diagram was not meant to show any evolution, and that “temporal connotations are made at one's peril.”
