= Virial mass =

Mass of an astrophysical system

In astrophysics, the virial mass is the mass of a gravitationally bound astrophysical system, assuming the virial theorem applies. In the context of galaxy formation and dark matter halos, the virial mass is defined as the mass enclosed within the virial radius $r_{\rm vir}$ of a gravitationally bound system, a radius within which the system obeys the virial theorem. The virial radius is determined using a "top-hat" model. A spherical "top hat" density perturbation destined to become a galaxy begins to expand, but the expansion is halted and reversed due to the mass collapsing under gravity until the sphere reaches equilibrium – it is said to be virialized. Within this radius, the sphere obeys the virial theorem which says that the average kinetic energy is equal to minus one half times the average potential energy, $\langle T \rangle = -\frac{1}{2} \langle U \rangle$, and this radius defines the virial radius.

== Virial radius ==
The virial radius of a gravitationally bound astrophysical system is the radius within which the virial theorem applies. It is defined as the radius at which the density is equal to the critical density $\rho_c$ of the universe at the redshift of the system, multiplied by an overdensity constant $\Delta_c$:

$\rho(<r_{\rm vir}) = \Delta_c \rho_c(t)=\Delta_{c}\frac{3 H^2(t)}{8 \pi G},$

where $\rho(<r_{\rm vir})$ is the halo's mean density within that radius, $\Delta_c$ is a parameter, $\rho_{c}(t) = \frac{3 H^2(t)}{8 \pi G}$ is the critical density of the Universe, $H^2(t)=H_0^2[\Omega_r(1+z)^4+\Omega_m(1+z)^3+(1-\Omega_{tot})(1+z)^2+\Omega_{\Lambda}]$ is the Hubble parameter, and $r_{\rm vir}$ is the virial radius. The time dependence of the Hubble parameter indicates that the redshift of the system is important, as the Hubble parameter changes with time: today's Hubble parameter, referred to as the Hubble constant $H_0$, is not the same as the Hubble parameter at an earlier time in the Universe's history, or in other words, at a different redshift. The overdensity $\Delta_c$ is approximated by $\Delta_c \approx 18\pi^2+82x-39x^2,$ where $x=\Omega_m(z)-1$, $\Omega_m(z)=\frac{\Omega_0(1+z)^3}{E(z)^2},$ $\Omega_0=\Omega_m(0)=\frac{8 \pi G \rho_0}{3 H_0^2},$ and $E(z)=\frac{H(z)}{H_0}$. Since it depends on the density parameter of matter $\Omega_m(z)$, its value depends on the cosmological model used. In an Einstein–de Sitter model it equals $18\pi^2\approx 178$. This definition is not universal, however, as the exact value of $\Delta_c$ depends on the cosmology. In an Einstein–de Sitter model, it is assumed that the density parameter is due to matter only, where $\Omega_m=1$. Compare this to the currently accepted cosmological model for the universe, ΛCDM model, where $\Omega_m=0.3$ and $\Omega_{\Lambda}=0.7$; in this case, $\Delta_c \approx 100$ (at a redshift of zero; with increased redshift the value approaches the Einstein-de Sitter value and then drops to a value of 56.65 for an empty de Sitter universe). Nevertheless, it is typically assumed that $\Delta_c = 200$ for the purpose of using a common definition, also giving the correct one-digit rounding for a long period 1090 > z > 0.87, and this is denoted as $r_{200}$ for the virial radius and $M_{200}$ for the virial mass. Using this convention, the mean density is given by $\rho(<r_{200}) = 200 \rho_c(t)=200\frac{3 H^2(t)}{8 \pi G}.$

Other conventions for the overdensity constant include $\Delta_c = 500$, or $\Delta_c = 1000$, depending on the type of analysis being done, in which case the virial radius and virial mass is signified by the relevant subscript.

== Defining the virial mass ==
Given the virial radius and the overdensity convention, the virial mass $M_{\rm vir}$ can be found through the relation

$M_{\rm vir}=\frac{4}{3}\pi r_{\rm vir}^3 \rho(<r_{\rm vir})=\frac{4}{3}\pi r_{\rm vir}^3 \Delta_c \rho_{c}.$If the convention that $\Delta_c = 200$ is used, then this becomes$M_{200}=\frac{4}{3}\pi r_{200}^3 200 \rho_{c}=\frac{100 r_{200}^3 H^2(t)}{G},$where $H(t)$ is the Hubble parameter as described above, and G is the gravitational constant. This defines the virial mass of an astrophysical system.

== Applications to dark matter halos ==
Given $M_{200}$ and $r_{200}$, properties of dark matter halos can be defined, including circular velocity, the density profile, and total mass. $M_{200}$ and $r_{200}$ are directly related to the Navarro–Frenk–White (NFW) profile, a density profile that describes dark matter halos modeled with the cold dark matter paradigm. The NFW profile is given by$\rho(r)=\frac{\delta_c\rho_{c}}{r/r_s(1+r/r_s)^2},$where $\rho_c$ is the critical density, and the overdensity $\delta_c=\frac{200}{3}\frac{c_{200}^3}{\ln(1+c_{200})-\frac{c_{200}}{1+c_{200}}}$ (not to be confused with $\Delta_c$) and the scale radius $r_s$ are unique to each halo, and the concentration parameter is given by $c_{200}=\frac{r_{200}}{r_s}$. In place of $\delta_c\rho_{c}$, $\rho_s$ is often used, where $\rho_s$ is a parameter unique to each halo. The total mass of the dark matter halo can then be computed by integrating over the volume of the density out to the virial radius $r_{200}$:

$M=\int \limits_{0}^{r_{200}}4\pi r^2\rho(r)dr=4\pi \rho_s r_s^3[\ln(\frac{r_{200}+r_s}{r_s})-\frac{r_{200}}{r_{200}+r_s}]=4\pi \rho_s r_s^3[\ln(1+c_{200})-\frac{c_{200}}{1+c_{200}}].$

From the definition of the circular velocity, $V_c(r)=\sqrt{\frac{GM(r)}{r}},$ we can find the circular velocity at the virial radius $r_{200}$:$V_{200}=\sqrt{\frac{GM_{200}}{r_{200}}}.$Then the circular velocity for the dark matter halo is given by$V_c^2(r)=V_{200}^2\frac{1}{x}\frac{\ln(1+cx)-(cx)/(1+cx)}{\ln(1+c)-c/(1+c)},$where $x=r/r_{200}$.

Although the NFW profile is commonly used, other profiles like the Einasto profile and profiles that take into account the adiabatic contraction of the dark matter due to the baryonic content are also used to characterize dark matter halos.

To compute the total mass of the system, including stars, gas, and dark matter, the Jeans equations need to be used with density profiles for each component.

== See also ==
- Dark matter halo
- Jeans equations
- Navarro–Frenk–White profile
- Virial theorem
