= Henry Kandrup =

American astrophysicist

Henry Emil Kandrup
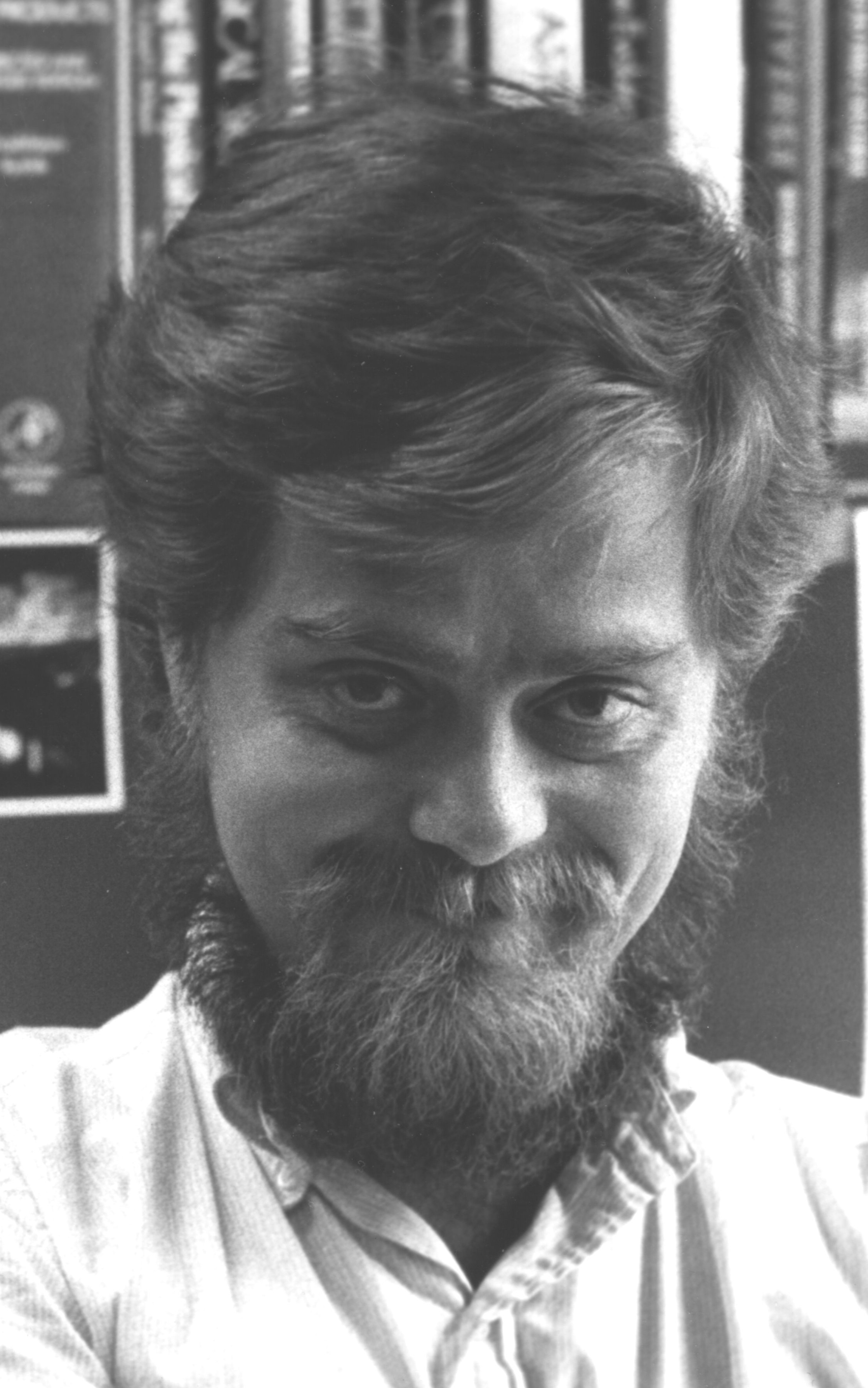
- Born: July 24, 1955; Manhasset, New York
- Died: October 18, 2003 (aged 48); Gainesville, Florida, USA
- Citizenship: United States
- Education: University of Chicago
- Scientific career
- Fields: Astrophysics, Plasma Physics
- Workplaces: University of Florida, Gainesville (1990-2003)
- Doctoral advisor: James Ipser

Henry Emil Kandrup (July 24, 1955 – October 18, 2003) was an American astrophysicist and professor at the University of Florida, Gainesville. His major contributions were in the areas of galaxy dynamics and plasma physics.

== Early life and education ==
Kandrup was born in Manhasset, New York and spent most of his childhood in Great Neck. His parents, Jytte and Fred, were immigrants from Denmark where his father had worked as a silver smith. He graduated from the Brooks School in Andover, Massachusetts at the age of 16, then enrolled at Cornell, transferring to Princeton the following year. He received his PhD in 1980 from the University of Chicago where his thesis advisor was James Ipser. He taught at Oakland University and Syracuse University before coming to the University of Florida in 1990.

As a child, Kandrup was playing the organ, piano and French horn. He was also a passionate devotee of opera and ballet.

== Scientific contributions ==
Kandrup's work led to greater understanding in the fields of stellar dynamics, chaos, and plasma physics. Much of Kandrup's research was directed toward developing a more refined mathematical description of dynamical relaxation in stellar systems. In a series of papers from the early 1990s, Henry developed the idea of chaotic phase mixing, the process by which an ensemble of points evolves toward a uniform coarse-grained population of phase space.

Among his other contributions were a demonstration of the equivalence of Landau damping and phase mixing; a proof (with J. F. Sygnet) of the linear stability of a broad class of stellar systems; and a generalization of Jeans's theorem to non-integrable systems. At the time of his death, he was investigating the chaotic dynamics of charged particle beams, and the influence of binary supermassive black holes on the motion of stars in galaxies.

Kandrup organized more than a dozen workshops on nonlinear dynamics at the University of Florida.

== Named after him ==
- Asteroid 12008 Kandrup
