= Mysterious universe =

Mysterious universe may refer to:

- Arthur C. Clarke's Mysterious Universe, a television series by science fiction writer Arthur C. Clarke
- The Mysterious Universe, a 1930 book about science by astrophysicist James Hopwood Jeans
- Mysterious Universe: A Handbook of Astronomical Anomalies, a 1979 book about anomalous phenomena by William R. Corliss
