= The Universe Around Us =

1929 book by James Jeans

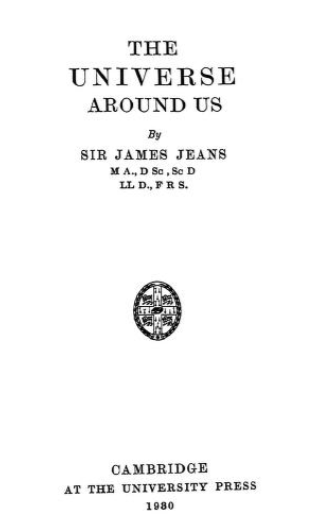
- Author: Sir James Jeans
- Publisher: Cambridge University Press
- Publication date: 1929

The Universe Around Us is a science book written by English astrophysicist Sir James Jeans, first published in 1929 by Cambridge University Press.

== Editions ==
- First Edition...1929 ...Reprinted...1929, 1930
- Second Edition..1930 ...Reprinted...1930, 1931
- Third Edition...1933 ...Reprinted...1938
- Fourth Edition..1944 ...Reprinted...1945, 1946, 1953 ...Revised & Reset...1960
- First Paperback Edition...1960

== Preface ==
"The present book contains a brief account, written in simple language, of the methods and results of modern astronomical research, both observational and theoretical. Special attention has been given to problems of cosmogony and evolution, and to the general structure of the universe. My ideal, perhaps never wholly attainable, has been that of the making the entire book intelligible to readers with no special scientific knowledge. Parts of the book cover the same ground as various lectures I have recently delivered to University and other audiences, including a course of wireless talks I gave last autumn. It has been found necessary to rewrite these almost in their entirety, so that very few sentences remain in their original form, but those who have asked me to publish my lectures and wireless talks will find the substance of them in the present book."
-J.H.JEANS - DORKING, 1 May 1929

== Preface to Second Edition ==
"In preparing a second edition, I have taken advantage of a great number of suggestions made by correspondents and reviewers, to whom I offer my sincerest thanks. I have also inserted discussions of the new planet Pluto, the rotation of the galaxy, the apparent expansion of the universe, and other subjects which have become important since the first edition was published, and in general have tried to bring the book up to date."
-J.H.JEANS - DORKING, 2 August 1930

== From the Preface to Third Edition ==
"The three years which have elapsed since the second edition of this book appeared have been more than usually eventful for those parts of science with which the book deals. At the sub-atomic end of the scale of nature, the uncharged neutron and the positively-charged electron have been discovered. At the other end of the scale there is much new knowledge, both observational and theoretical, on the expansion of the universe and cosmic radiation. In the intermediate parts of the scale, in addition to a large mass of new observational material, we find new spectroscopic methods for investigating the constitution and rotations of the stars, and new theoretical discussions of their structure. From these and other causes, the present edition is substantially longer than its predecessors."
-J.H.JEANS - DORKING, 7 October 1933

== Preface to Fourth Edition ==
"In the interval since the third edition appeared, astronomy has continued its triumphal progress. Perhaps the most noteworthy single episode has been the discovery that the physics of atomic nuclei can not only give a satisfactory account of the radiation of the sun and stars, but can also explain many hitherto puzzling stellar characteristics; the largest and smallest ingredients of nature - the star and the atomic nucleus - have met and thrown light on one another, to the great improvement of our understanding of both. This and other outstanding advances have necessitated many changes in and additions to my book. A large part of it has been rewritten, while most of the remainder has been substantially amended."
-J.H.JEANS - DORKING, September 1943

== Contents ==
- Introduction - The Study of Astronomy - Page...1

Chapter

- I Exploring the Sky...14
- II Exploring the Atom...98
- III Exploring in Time...151
- IV Stars...161
- V Carving out the Universe...210
- VI The Solar System...237
- VII Beginnings and Endings...276
- Index...290

There are 32 pages of photographic plates:

== Plates ==
- I The Discovery of Pluto - Facing Page...16
- II The Milky Way in the neighbourhood of the Southern Cross...17
- III The Milky Way in the region of p Ophiuchi...18
- IV The Star-cloud in Sagittarius...19
- V Part of the outer regions of the Great Nebula M31 in Andromeda...22
- VI Planetary Nebulae:
1. N.G.C. 2022
2. N.G.C. 6720 (The Ring Nebula)
3. N.G.C. 1501
4. N.G.C. 7662...23
- VII The Nebula in Cygnus...24
- VIII The Trifid Nebula M20 in Sagittarius - Following...24
- IX The "Horse's Head" in the Nebula in Orion...24
- X The Great Nebula M31 in Andromeda - Facing...25
- XI The Nebula N.G.C. 891 in Andromeda seen edge-on...26
- XII The Nebula N.G.C. 7217...27
- XIII The Lesser and Greater Magellanic Clouds...30
- XIV The Globular Cluster M13 in Hercules...31
- XV Stellar Spectra...32
- XVI The Doppler Effect in Stellar Spectra...33
- XVII The central region of the Great Nebula M31 in Andromeda...68
- XVIII The Nebula M33 in Triangulum...69
- XIX The Nebula N.G.C. 7331 in Pegasus, and a remote Cluster of faint Nebula - Facing...70
- XX Nebular Spectra....71
- XXI The Nebula N.G.C. 4594 in Virgo...74
- XXII A compact Cluster of faint Nebulae in Pegasus...75
- XXIII The twin Nebulae N.G.C. 4567-8...76
- XXIV The Nebula M81 in Ursa Major...77
- XXV The tracks of a- and b-particles...122
- XXVI Collisions of a-particles with atoms...123
- XXVII The "Whirlpool" Nebula M51 in Canes Venatici...220
- XXVIII A sequence of Nebular Configurations:
1. N.G.C. 3379
2. N.G.C. 4621
3. N.G.C. 3115
4. N.G.C. 4594 in Virgo
5. N.G.C. 4565 in Berenice's hair...221
- XXIX Two Nebulae (N.G.C. 4395, 4401) suggestive of Tidal Action...244
- XXX The Nebula N.G.C. 7479...245
- XXXI The Nebula M101 in Ursa Major...252
- XXXII Saturn and its System of Rings...253
