= Bonnor–Ebert mass =

In astrophysics, the Bonnor–Ebert mass is the largest mass that an isothermal gas sphere embedded in a pressurized medium can have while still remaining in hydrostatic equilibrium. Clouds of gas with masses greater than the Bonnor–Ebert mass must inevitably undergo gravitational collapse to form much smaller and denser objects. As the gravitational collapse of an interstellar gas cloud is the first stage in the formation of a protostar, the Bonnor–Ebert mass is an important quantity in the study of star formation.

For a gas cloud embedded in a medium with a gas pressure $p_{0}$, the Bonnor–Ebert mass is given by

$M_{BE} (p_0)={225\over {32 \sqrt{5 \pi}}}{c_s^4\over {(aG)}^{3 / 2}} {1\over \sqrt{p_0}}$

where G is the gravitational constant and $c_s \equiv \sqrt{kT/{\mu m_H}}$ is the isothermal sound speed ($\gamma = 1$) with $\mu$ as the molecular mass. $a$ is a dimensionless constant which varies based on the density distribution of the cloud. For a uniform mass density $a=1$ and for a centrally peaked density $a\approx 1.67$.

== See also ==
- Jeans mass
