= Jeans instability =

Star formation process

The Jeans instability is a concept in astrophysics that describes an instability that leads to the gravitational collapse of a cloud of gas or dust. It causes the collapse of interstellar gas clouds and subsequent star formation. It occurs when the internal gas pressure is not strong enough to prevent the gravitational collapse of a region filled with matter. It is named after James Jeans.

For stability, the cloud must be in hydrostatic equilibrium, which in case of a spherical cloud translates to

$$\frac{dp}{dr}=-\frac{G\rho(r)M_\text{enc}(r)}{r^2},$$

where $M_\text{enc}(r)$ is the enclosed mass, p is the pressure, $\rho(r)$ is the density of the gas (at radius r), G is the gravitational constant, and r is the radius. The equilibrium is stable if small perturbations are damped and unstable if they are amplified. In general, the cloud is unstable if it is either very massive at a given temperature or very cool at a given mass; under these circumstances, the gas pressure gradient cannot overcome gravitational force, and the cloud will collapse. This is called the "Jeans collapse criterion"....

The Jeans instability likely determines when star formation occurs in molecular clouds.

== History ==
In 1720, Edmund Halley considered a universe without edges and pondered what would happen if the "system of the world", which exists within the universe, were finite or infinite. In the finite case, stars would gravitate towards the center, and if infinite, all the stars would be nearly in equilibrium and the stars would eventually reach a resting place. Contrary to the writing of Halley, Isaac Newton, in a 1692/3 letter to Richard Bentley, wrote that it's hard to imagine that particles in an infinite space should be able to stand in such a configuration to result in a perfect equilibrium.

James Jeans extended the issue of gravitational stability to include pressure. In 1902, Jeans wrote, similarly to Halley, that a finite distribution of matter, assuming pressure does not prevent it, will collapse gravitationally towards its center. For an infinite distribution of matter, there are two possible scenarios. An exactly homogeneous distribution has no clear center of mass and no clear way to define a gravitational acceleration direction. For the other case, Jeans extends what Newton wrote about: Jeans demonstrated that small deviations from exact homogeneity lead to instabilities.

== Jeans mass ==
The Jeans mass is named after the British physicist Sir James Jeans, who considered the process of gravitational collapse within a gaseous cloud. He was able to show that, under appropriate conditions, a cloud, or part of one, would become unstable and begin to collapse when it lacked sufficient gaseous pressure support to balance the force of gravity. The cloud is stable for sufficiently small mass (at a given temperature and radius), but once this critical mass is exceeded, it will begin a process of runaway contraction until some other force can impede the collapse. He derived a formula for calculating this critical mass as a function of its density and temperature. The greater the mass of the cloud, the bigger its size, and the colder its temperature, the less stable it will be against gravitational collapse.

The approximate value of the Jeans mass may be derived through a simple physical argument. One begins with a spherical gaseous region of radius R, mass M, and with a gaseous sound speed c_{S}. The gas is compressed slightly and it takes a time

$$t_\text{sound}=\frac{R}{c_\text{s}}\approx0.5\text{ Myr}\cdot\frac{R}{0.1\text{ pc}}\cdot\left(\frac{c_\text{s}}{0.2\text{ km/s}}\right)^{-1}$$

for sound waves to cross the region and attempt to push back and re-establish the system in pressure balance. At the same time, gravity will attempt to contract the system even further, and will do so on a free-fall time

$$t_\text{ff}=\frac{1}{(G\rho)^{1/2}}\approx2\text{ Myr}\cdot\left(\frac{n}{10^3\text{ cm}^{-3}}\right)^{-1/2},$$

where G is the universal gravitational constant, $\rho$ is the gas density within the region, and $n = \rho/\mu$ is the gas number density for mean mass per particle (μ = 3.9 × 10^^{−24} g is appropriate for molecular hydrogen with 20% helium by number). When the sound-crossing time is less than the free-fall time, pressure forces temporarily overcome gravity, and the system returns to a stable equilibrium. However, when the free-fall time is less than the sound-crossing time, gravity overcomes pressure forces, and the region undergoes gravitational collapse. The condition for gravitational collapse is therefore $t_\text{ff}<t_\text{sound}$.

The resultant Jeans length is:

$$\lambda_\text{J}=\frac{c_\text{s}}{(G\rho)^{1/2}}\approx0.4\text{ pc}\cdot\frac{c_\text{s}}{0.2\text{ km/s}}\cdot\left(\frac{n}{10^3\text{ cm}^{-3}}\right)^{-1/2}.$$

All scales larger than the Jeans length are unstable to gravitational collapse, whereas smaller scales are stable. The mass contained in a sphere of radius $R_\text{J}=\frac{1}{2}\lambda_\text{J}$ is the Jeans mass

$$M_\text{J}=\frac{4\pi}{3}\rho R_\text{J}^3=\frac{\pi}{6}\cdot\frac{c_\text{s}^3}{G^{3/2}\rho^{1/2}}\approx2\text{ M}_\odot\cdot\left(\frac{c_\text{s}}{0.2\text{ km/s}}\right)^3\left(\frac{n}{10^3\text{ cm}^{-3}}\right)^{-1/2}.$$

=== Jeans swindle ===
It was later pointed out by other astrophysicists, including Binney and Tremaine, that the original analysis used by Jeans was flawed: in his formal analysis, although Jeans assumed that the collapsing region of the cloud was surrounded by an infinite, static medium, the surrounding medium should in reality also be collapsing, since all larger scales are also gravitationally unstable by the same analysis. The influence of this medium was completely ignored in Jeans's analysis. This flaw has come to be known as the "Jeans swindle".

When using a more careful analysis, other factors such as the expansion of the Universe fortuitously cancel out the apparent error in Jeans's analysis, and his results are correct, even if the derivation might have been dubious.

=== Energy-based derivation ===
An alternative, arguably even simpler, derivation can be found using energy considerations. In the interstellar cloud, two opposing forces are at work. The gas pressure, caused by the thermal movement of the atoms or molecules comprising the cloud, tries to make the cloud expand, whereas gravitation tries to make the cloud collapse. The Jeans mass is the critical mass where both forces are in equilibrium with each other. In the following derivation numerical constants (such as π) and constants of nature (such as the gravitational constant) will be ignored. They will be reintroduced in the result.

Consider a homogeneous spherical gas cloud with radius R. In order to compress this sphere to a radius $R-dR$, work must be done against the gas pressure. During the compression, gravitational energy is released. When this energy equals the amount of work to be done on the gas, the critical mass is attained. Let M be the mass of the cloud, T the (absolute) temperature, n the particle density, and p the gas pressure. The work to be done equals pdV. Using the ideal gas law, according to which $p=nT$, one arrives at the following expression for the work:

$$dW=nTR^2\,dR.$$

The gravitational potential energy of a sphere with mass M and radius R is, apart from constants, given by the following expression:

$$U=\frac{M^2}{R}.$$

The amount of energy released when the sphere contracts from radius R to radius $R-dR$ is obtained by differentiation this expression to R, so

$$dU=\frac{M^2}{R^2}\,dR.$$

The critical mass is attained as soon as the released gravitational energy is equal to the work done on the gas:

$$\frac{M^2}{R^2}=nTR^2.$$

Next, the radius R must be expressed in terms of the particle density n and the mass M. This can be done using the relation

$$M=nR^3.$$

A little algebra leads to the following expression for the critical mass:

$$M_\text{J}=\left(\frac{T^3}{n}\right)^{1/2}.$$

If during the derivation all constants are taken along, the resulting expression is

$$M_\text{J}=\left(\frac{375k_{\text{B}}^3}{4\pi m^4G^3}\right)^{1/2}\left(\frac{T^3}{n}\right)^{1/2},$$

where k_{B} is the Boltzmann constant, G the gravitational constant, and m the mass of a particle comprising the gas. Assuming the cloud to consist of atomic hydrogen, the prefactor can be calculated. If we take the solar mass as the unit of mass, and use units of m^{−3} for the particle density, the result is

$$M_\text{J}=3\times10^4\left(\frac{T^3}{n}\right)^{1/2}.$$

== Jeans length ==
The Jeans length is the critical radius of a cloud (typically a cloud of interstellar molecular gas and dust) where thermal energy, which causes the cloud to expand, is counteracted by gravity, which causes the cloud to collapse. It is named after the British astronomer Sir James Jeans, who concerned himself with the stability of spherical nebulae in the early 1900s.

The formula for the Jeans length is:

$$\lambda_\text{J}=\left(\frac{15k_\text{B} T}{4\pi G\mu\rho}\right)^{1/2}$$

where k_{B} is the Boltzmann constant, T is the temperature of the cloud, μ is the mean molecular weight of the particles, G is the gravitational constant, and ρ is the cloud's mass density (i.e. the cloud's mass divided by the cloud's volume).

A way to conceptualize the Jeans length is in terms of a close approximation, in which the factors 15 and 4π are discarded and in which ρ is rephrased as $M/r^3$. The formula for the Jeans length then becomes

$$\lambda_\text{J}\approx\left(\frac{k_\text{B}Tr^3}{GM\mu}\right)^{1/2},$$

where r is the radius of the cloud.

It follows immediately that $\lambda_\text{J}=r$ when $k_\text{B}T=GM\mu/r$; i.e., the cloud's radius is the Jeans length when thermal energy per particle equals gravitational work per particle. At this critical length, the cloud neither expands nor contracts. It is only when thermal energy is not equal to gravitational work that the cloud either expands and cools or contracts and warms, a process that continues until equilibrium is reached.

== The Jeans length as oscillation wavelength ==
The Jeans length is the oscillation wavelength (respectively, the Jeans wavenumber, k_{J}) below which stable oscillations rather than gravitational collapse will occur.

$$\lambda_\text{J}=\frac{2\pi}{k_\text{J}}=c_\text{s}\left(\frac{\pi}{G\rho}\right)^{1/2},$$

where G is the gravitational constant, c_{S} is the sound speed, and ρ is the enclosed mass density.

It is also the distance a sound wave would travel in the collapse time.

== Fragmentation ==
Jeans instability can also give rise to fragmentation in certain conditions. To derive the condition for fragmentation an adiabatic process is assumed in an ideal gas and also a polytropic equation of state is taken. The derivation is shown below through a dimensional analysis:

For adiabatic processes, $PV^\gamma = \text{constant} \rightarrow V \propto P^{-1/\gamma}$.

For an ideal gas, $PV = nRT \Rightarrow P\cdot P^{-1/\gamma} = P^{(\gamma-1)/\gamma} \propto T \Rightarrow P \propto T^{\gamma/(\gamma-1)}$.

Polytropic equation of state, $P = K \rho^\gamma \rightarrow T \propto \rho^{\gamma-1}$.

Jeans mass, $M_\text{J} \propto T^{3/2} \rho^{-1/2} \propto \rho^{(3/2)(\gamma-1)}\rho^{-1/2}$.

Thus, $M_\text{J} \propto \rho^{(3/2)(\gamma-4/3)}$.

If the adiabatic index $\gamma>\frac{4}{3}$, the Jeans mass increases with increasing density, while if $\gamma<\frac{4}{3}$ the Jeans mass decreases with increasing density. During gravitational collapse density always increases, thus in the second case the Jeans mass will decrease during collapse, allowing smaller overdense regions to collapse, leading to fragmentation of the giant molecular cloud. For an ideal monatomic gas, the adiabatic index is 5/3. However, in astrophysical objects this value is usually close to 1 (for example, in partially ionized gas at temperatures low compared to the ionization energy). More generally, the process is not really adiabatic but involves cooling by radiation that is much faster than the contraction, so that the process can be modeled by an adiabatic index as low as 1 (which corresponds to the polytropic index of an isothermal gas). So the second case is the rule rather than an exception in stars. This is the reason why stars usually form in clusters.

== See also ==
- Bonnor–Ebert mass
- Langmuir waves (similar waves in a plasma)
