= James Jeans =

English physicist, astronomer, and mathematician (1877–1946)

Sir James Jeans OM FRS
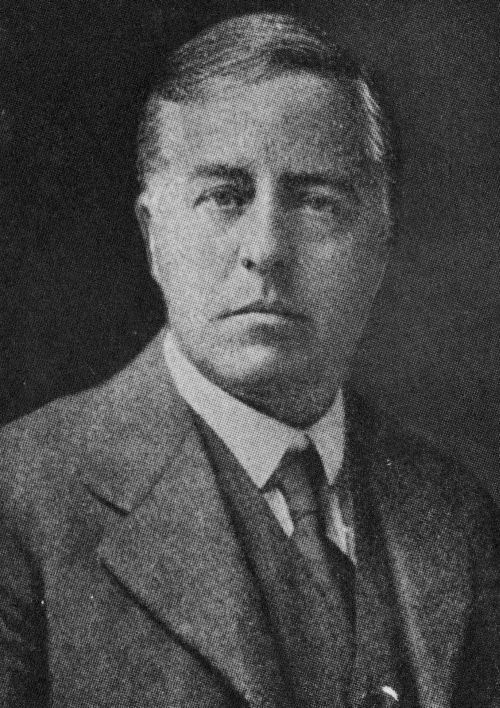
- Born: James Hopwood Jeans; 11 September 1877; Ormskirk, Lancashire, England
- Died: 16 September 1946 (aged 69); Dorking, Surrey, England
- Education: Merchant Taylors' School; Cambridge University
- Known for: Jeans equations Jeans escape Jeans instability Jeans mass Jeans length Jeans's theorem Rayleigh–Jeans law Method of image charges Tidal hypothesis
- Awards: Smith's Prize (1901); Adams Prize (1917); Royal Medal (1919); RAS Gold Medal (1922)
- Scientific career
- Fields: Astronomy, mathematics, physics
- Workplaces: Trinity College, Cambridge; Princeton University
- Notable students: Ronald Fisher

Sir James Hopwood Jeans OM FRS (11 September 1877 – 16 September 1946) was an English physicist, mathematician and an astronomer. He served as a secretary of the Royal Society from 1919 to 1929, and was the president of the Royal Astronomical Society from 1925 to 1927, and won its Gold Medal.

== Early life ==
Born in Ormskirk, Lancashire, the son of William Tulloch Jeans, a parliamentary correspondent and author. Jeans was educated at Merchant Taylors' School, Wilson's Grammar School, Camberwell and Trinity College, Cambridge. As a gifted student, Jeans was counselled to take an aggressive approach to the Cambridge Mathematical Tripos competition:

Early in the Michaelmas term of 1896, Walker sent for Jeans and Hardy and advised them to take Part I of the Mathematical Tripos in two years. He told them that he could not guarantee that they would come out higher than fifteenth in the list of wranglers, but he understood that they would never regret it. They accepted his advice, and went to R. R. Webb, the most famous private coach of the period ... At the end of his first year, [Jeans] told Walker that he had quarrelled with Webb, his coach. Walker accordingly took Jeans himself, and the result was a triumph: ... Jeans was bracketed second wrangler with J. F. Cameron ... [and] R.W.H.T. Hudson was Senior Wrangler and G. H. Hardy fourth wrangler.

== Career ==
Jeans was elected Fellow of Trinity College in October 1901, and taught at Cambridge, but went to Princeton University in 1904 as a professor of applied mathematics. He returned to Cambridge in 1910. From 1923 to 1944 he was associated with Caltech's Mount Wilson Observatory.

He made important contributions in many areas of physics, including quantum theory, the theory of radiation and stellar evolution. His analysis of rotating bodies led him to conclude that Pierre-Simon Laplace's theory that the Solar System formed from a single cloud of gas was incorrect, proposing instead that the planets condensed from material drawn out of the Sun by a hypothetical catastrophic near-collision with a passing star. This theory is not accepted today.

Jeans, along with Arthur Eddington, is a founder of British cosmology. In 1928, Jeans was the first to conjecture a steady state cosmology based on a hypothesized continuous creation of matter in the universe. In his book Astronomy and Cosmogony (1928) he stated: "The type of conjecture which presents itself, somewhat insistently, is that the centers of the nebulae are of the nature 'singular points' at which matter is poured into our universe from some other, and entirely extraneous spatial dimension, so that, to a denizen of our universe, they appear as points at which matter is being continually created." This theory fell out of favour when the 1965 discovery of the cosmic microwave background was widely interpreted as the tell-tale signature of the Big Bang.

His scientific reputation is grounded in the monographs The Dynamical Theory of Gases (1904), Theoretical Mechanics (1906), and Mathematical Theory of Electricity and Magnetism (1908). After retiring in 1929, he wrote a number of books for the lay public, including The Stars in Their Courses (1931), The Universe Around Us, Through Space and Time (1934), The New Background of Science (1933), and The Mysterious Universe. These books made Jeans fairly well known as an expositor of the revolutionary scientific discoveries of his day, especially in relativity and physical cosmology.

In 1939, the Journal of the British Astronomical Association reported that Jeans was going to stand as a candidate for parliament for the Cambridge University constituency. The election, expected to take place in 1939 or 1940, did not take place until 1945, and without his involvement.

He also wrote the book Physics and Philosophy (1943) where he explores the different views on reality from two different perspectives: science and philosophy. On his religious views, Jeans was an agnostic Freemason.

== Personal life ==
Jeans married twice, first to the American poet Charlotte Tiffany Mitchell in 1907. She predeceased him. He then married the Austrian organist and harpsichordist Susanne Hock (better known as Susi Jeans) in 1935. Susi and Jeans had three children: Michael, Christopher, and Katharine . As a birthday present for his wife, he wrote the book Science and Music.

=== Death ===
Jeans died in 1946 in the presence of his wife and Joy Adamson, who suggested to the widow to create a death mask of Jeans. It is now held by the Royal Society.

== Major accomplishments ==
One of Jeans's major discoveries, named the Jeans length, is a critical radius of an interstellar cloud in space. It depends on the temperature, and density of the cloud, and the mass of the particles composing the cloud. A cloud that is smaller than its Jeans length will not have sufficient gravity to overcome the repulsive gas pressure forces and condense to form a star, whereas a cloud that is larger than its Jeans length will collapse.

$$\lambda_{\rm J}=\sqrt{\frac{15k_{\rm B}T}{4\pi Gm\rho}}$$

Jeans came up with another version of this equation, called the Jeans mass or the Jeans instability, that solves for the critical mass a cloud must attain before being able to collapse.

Jeans also helped to discover the Rayleigh–Jeans law, which relates the energy density of black-body radiation to the temperature of the emission source.

$$f(\lambda) = 8\pi c \frac{k_{\rm B}T}{\lambda^4}$$

Jeans is also credited with calculating the rate of atmospheric escape from a planet due to kinetic energy of the gas molecules, a process known as Jeans escape.

== Idealism ==
Jeans espoused a philosophy of science rooted in the metaphysical doctrine of idealism and opposed to materialism in his speaking engagements and books. His popular science publications first advanced these ideas in 1929's The Universe Around Us when he likened "discussing the creation of the universe in terms of time and space," to, "trying to discover the artist and the action of painting, by going to the edge of the canvas." But he turned to this idea as the primary subject of his best-selling 1930 book, The Mysterious Universe, where he asserted that a picture of the universe as a "non-mechanical reality" was emerging from the science of the day.

The Universe begins to look more like a great thought than like a great machine. Mind no longer appears to be an accidental intruder into the realm of matter... we ought rather hail it as the creator and governor of the realm of matter.

— James Jeans, The Mysterious Universe,

In a 1931 interview published in The Observer, Jeans was asked if he believed that life was an accident or if it was, "part of some great scheme." He said that he favored, "the idealistic theory that consciousness is fundamental, and that the material universe is derivative from consciousness," going on to suggest that, "each individual consciousness ought to be compared to a brain-cell in a universal mind."

In his 1934 address to the British Association for the Advancement of Science meeting in Aberdeen as the Association's president, Jeans spoke specifically to the work of Descartes and its relevance to the modern philosophy of science. He argued that, "There is no longer room for the kind of dualism which has haunted philosophy since the days of Descartes."

When Daniel Helsing reviewed The Mysterious Universe for Physics Today in 2020, he summarized the philosophical conclusions of the book, "Jeans argues that we must give up science's long-cherished materialistic and mechanical worldview, which posits that nature operates like a machine and consists solely of material particles interacting with each other." His evaluation of Jeans contrasted these philosophical views with modern science communicators such as Neil deGrasse Tyson and Sean Carroll who he suggested, "would likely take issue with Jeans's idealism."

== Awards and honours ==
- Fellow of the Royal Society in May 1906
- Bakerian Lecture to Royal Society in 1917.
- Royal Medal of the Royal Society in 1919.
- Hopkins Prize of the Cambridge Philosophical Society 1921–1924.
- Gold Medal of the Royal Astronomical Society in 1922.
- He was knighted in the 1928 Birthday Honours.
- Franklin Medal of the Franklin Institute in 1931.
- In 1933 Jeans was invited to deliver the Royal Institution Christmas Lecture on Through Space and Time.
- Mukerjee Medal of the Indian Association for the Cultivation of Science in 1937.
- President of the 25th session of the Indian Science Congress in 1938.
- Calcutta Medal of the Indian Science Congress Association in 1938.
- Lorimer Medal of the Astronomical Society of Edinburgh in 1938 for which he gave the Lorimer Lecture: The Depths of Space.
- Member of the Order of Merit in 1939.
- The crater Jeans on the Moon is named after him, as is the crater Jeans on Mars.
- The String Quartet No.7 by Robert Simpson was written in tribute to him on the centenary of his birth, 1977.

== Bibliography ==
The Astronomical Horizon https://www.amazon.co.uk/dp/B000NIS57O?ref=myi_title_dp- The Philip Maurice Deneke Lecture 1944 - Published Oxford University Press 1945

- The Growth of Physical Science. Cambridge University Press. 2009 [1947]. ISBN 978-1-108-00565-4.
- Physics and Philosophy. Courier Corporation. 1981 [1942]. ISBN 978-0-486-24117-3.
- An Introduction to the Kinetic Theory of Gases. CUP Archive. 1982 [1940]. ISBN 978-0-521-09232-6.
- Science and Music. Cambridge University Press. 1937.
- Through Space and Time. Cambridge University Press. 2009 [1934]. ISBN 978-1-108-00571-5.
- The New Background of Science. CUP Archive. 1953 [1933]. GGKEY:HCUUR8F8EL0.
- Stars in Their Courses. Cambridge University Press. 2009 [1931]. ISBN 978-1-108-00570-8.
- The Mysterious Universe. CUP Archive. 1944 [1930]. GGKEY:LXRDCH5GSZR.
- Astronomy and Cosmogony. Cambridge University Press. 2009 [1928]. ISBN 978-0-521-74470-6.
- Mathematical Theory of Electricity and Magnetism. Cambridge University Press. 2009 [1925]. ISBN 978-1-108-00561-6.
- Atomicity and Quanta. Cambridge University Press. 2009 [1926]. ISBN 978-1-108-00563-0.
- Problems of Cosmology and Stellar Dynamics. Cambridge University Press. 2009 [1919]. ISBN 978-1-108-00568-5.
- The Dynamical Theory of Gases. CUP Archive. 1925 [1904]. GGKEY:6UDJTT06BSL.
- The Universe Around Us. Macmillan. 1929.
- The Depths of Space, The Lorimer Lecture (PDF). Astronomical Society of Edinburgh. 1938. p. 15.

== Sources ==
- Allport, Denison Howard; Friskney, Norman J (1987). A Short History of Wilson's School. Wilson's School Charitable Trust.
- Bell, E.T. (1986). Men of Mathematics. Simon and Schuster. ISBN 978-0-671-62818-5. "The Great Architect of The Universe now begins to appear as a pure mathematician" (quoting Jeans, The Mysterious Universe, p. 134).
- Teilhard De Chardin, Pierre (2004). The Future of Man. Image Books/Doubleday. ISBN 978-0-385-51072-1. "We can hardly wonder, in the circumstances, that agnostics such as Sir James Jeans and Marcel Boll, and even convinced believers like Guardini, have uttered expressions ol amazement (tinged with heroic pessimism or triumphant detachment) at the apparent insignificance of the phenomenon of Life in terms of the cosmos— a little mold on a grain of dust..."
- Milne, E. A. (2013) [1952]. Sir James Jeans: A Biography. Cambridge University Press. ISBN 978-1-107-62333-0.
