= Jeans equations =

System of differential equations

University of Texas N-body Simulation. Governed by Jeans equations in a gravitational potential

The Jeans equations are a set of partial differential equations that describe the motion of a collection of stars in a gravitational field. The Jeans equations relate the second-order velocity moments to the density and potential of a stellar system for systems without collision. They are analogous to the Euler equations for fluid flow and may be derived from the collisionless Boltzmann equation. The Jeans equations can come in a variety of different forms, depending on the structure of what is being modelled. Most utilization of these equations has been found in simulations with large number of gravitationally bound objects.

== History ==
The Jeans equations were originally derived by James Clerk Maxwell. However, they were first applied to astronomy by James Jeans in 1915 while working on stellar hydrodynamics. Since then, multiple solutions to the equations have been calculated analytically and numerically. Some notable solutions include a spherically symmetric solution, derived by James Binney in 1983 and axisymmetric solutions found in 1995 by Richard Arnold.

== Mathematics ==
=== Derivation from Boltzmann equation ===
The collisionless Boltzmann equation, also called the Vlasov Equation is a special form of Liouville' equation and is given by:

${\partial f \over \partial t}+v {\partial f \over \partial r}-{\partial \Phi \over \partial r}{\partial f \over \partial v}=0$ Or in vector form: ${\partial f \over \partial t}+\vec{v}\cdot\vec{\nabla}f-\vec{\nabla}\Phi\cdot{\partial f \over \partial \vec{v}}=0$

Combining the Vlasov equation with the Poisson equation for gravity:
$$\nabla^2 \phi  =  4\pi G \rho.$$
gives the Jeans equations.

More explicitly, If n=n(x,t) is the density of stars in space, as a function of position x = (x_{1},x_{2},x_{3}) and time t, v = (v_{1},v_{2},v_{3}) is the velocity, and Φ = Φ(x,t) is the gravitational potential, the Jeans equations may be written as:

$\frac{\partial n }{\partial t} + \sum_i \frac{\partial(n \langle{v_i}\rangle)}{\partial x_i}=0,$

$$\frac{\partial(n \langle{v_j}\rangle)}{\partial t}  + n \frac{\partial \Phi}{\partial x_j}
+ \sum_i \frac{\partial(n \langle{v_i v_j}\rangle)}{\partial x_i}= 0 \qquad (j=1, 2, 3.)$$

Here, the ⟨...⟩ notation means an average at a given point and time (x,t), so that, for example, $\langle{v_1}\rangle$ is the average of component 1 of the velocity of the stars at a given point and time. The second set of equations may alternately be written as

$$n \frac{\partial \langle{v_j}\rangle}{\partial t}
+ \sum_i n \langle{v_i}\rangle \frac{\partial{\langle{v_j}\rangle}}{\partial x_i}
= -n \frac{\partial \Phi}{\partial x_j} - \sum_i \frac{\partial (n \sigma_{ij}^2)}{\partial x_i} \qquad (j=1, 2, 3.)$$

where the spatial part of the stress–energy tensor is defined as: $\sigma_{ij}^2=\langle{v_i v_j}\rangle-\langle{v_i}\rangle \langle{v_j}\rangle$ and measures the velocity dispersion in components i and j at a given point.

Some given assumptions regarding these equations include:

- The flow in phase space must conserve mass
- The density around a given star remains the same, or is incompressible

Notice that the Jeans equations contain 9 unknowns (3 average velocities and 6 stress tensor terms), but only 3 equations. This means that Jeans equations are not closed. To solve different systems, various assumptions are made about the stress tensor.

=== Spherical Jeans equations ===
One fundamental usage of Jean's equation is in spherical gravitational bodies. In spherical coordinates, the equations are:

${\partial \rho\langle v_r \rangle \over \partial t} +{\partial \rho\langle v_r^2 \rangle \over \partial r} + {\rho\over r}[2\langle v_r^2\rangle -\langle v_\theta^2\rangle -\langle v_\phi^2\rangle] + \rho {\partial \Phi \over \partial r} =0$

${\partial \rho\langle v_\theta \rangle \over \partial t} +{\partial \rho\langle v_rv_\theta \rangle \over \partial r} + {\rho\over r}[3\langle v_rv_\theta\rangle +(\langle v_\theta^2\rangle -\langle v_\phi^2\rangle)\cot(\theta)] =0$

${\partial \rho\langle v_\phi \rangle \over \partial t} +{\partial \rho\langle v_rv_\phi \rangle \over \partial r} + {\rho\over r}[3\langle v_rv_\phi\rangle +2\langle v_\theta v_\phi \rangle\cot(\theta)] =0$

Using the stress tensor with the assumption that it is diagonal and $\sigma_\theta^2 =\sigma_\phi^2$, can reduce these equations to a single simplified equation:

${\partial (\rho \sigma_r^2 ) \over \partial r} + {2\rho\over r}[\sigma_r^2 - \sigma_\theta^2] +\rho{\partial \Phi \over \partial r} =0$

Again, there are two unknown functions ($\sigma_r^2 (r)$ and $\sigma_\theta^2(r)$) that require assumptions for the equation to be solved.

== Applications ==
Jeans equation have found great utility in N-body simulation gravitational research. The scale of these simulations can range in size from just the Solar System to the entire universe. Using measurements of stellar number density and various kinematic values, parameters within the Jeans equations can be estimated. This allows for various analyses to be made through the lens of Jeans equations. This is particularly useful when simulating dark matter halo distributions, due to its isothermal, non-interactive behavior. Searches for structure in galaxy formation, dark matter formation, and universe formation can have observations supplemented with simulations using Jeans equations.

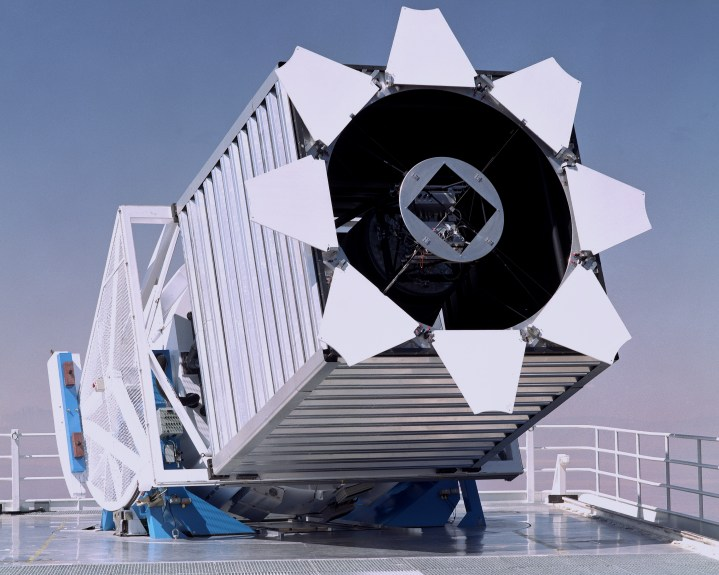
SDSS telescope that provides data for Jeans equation parameter estimation.

=== Milky Way dark matter halo ===
Artistic rendition of dark matter halo around the Milky Way. Jeans Equation simulations place limits on the size of this halo

An example of such an analysis is given by the constraints that can be placed on the dark matter halo within the Milky Way. Using Sloan Digital Sky Survey measurements of our Galaxy, researchers were able to simulate the dark matter halo distribution using Jeans equations. By comparing measured values with Jeans equation simulation results, they confirmed the need for extra dark matter and placed limits on its ellipsoid size. They estimated the ratio of minor to major axis of this halo to be 0.47 $\pm$ 0.14. This method has been applied to many other galactic halos and have produced similar results regarding dark matter halo topology.

=== Simulation limitations ===
The limiting factor of these simulations however, has been the data required to approximate stress tensor parameter values that dictate the Jeans equations behavior. Additionally, some constraints can be placed on Jeans equation simulations in order to produce reliable results Some of these limitations include a wavelength resolution requirement, variable gravitational softening, and a minimum vertical structure particle resolution.

== See also ==
- Jeans's theorem
