= The Mysterious Universe =

1930 book by James Jeans

- Author: Sir James Jeans
- Published: 1930 (Cambridge University Press)
- Pages: 163
- Dewey Decimal: 504
- LC Class: Q171 .J37

The Mysterious Universe is a popular science book by the British astrophysicist Sir James Jeans, first published in 1930 by the Cambridge University Press. In the United States, it was published by Macmillan.

The book is an expanded version of the Rede Lecture delivered at the University of Cambridge in 1930. It begins with a full-page citation of the famous passage in Plato's Republic, Book VII, laying out the allegory of the cave. The book made frequent reference to the quantum theory of radiation, begun by Max Planck in 1900, to Albert Einstein's general relativity, and to the new theories of quantum mechanics of Heisenberg and Schrödinger, of whose philosophical perplexities the author seemed well aware.

A second edition appeared in 1931. The book was reprinted 15 times between 1930 and 1938 and in September 2007 (ISBN 978-0548451168).

== Contents ==
- Foreword
- The Dying Sun
- The New World of Modern Physics
- Matter and Radiation
- Relativity and the Ether
- Into the Deep Waters
- Index

There are two pages of photographic plates:

- "The Depths of Space," taken with the Mount Wilson Observatory;
- "The Diffraction of Light and of Electrons," bearing out the wave nature of electrons and protons predicted by quantum theory.

The US edition has woodcut illustrations by the painter Walter Tandy Murch.

== Criticism ==
The book was denounced by the Cambridge philosopher Ludwig Wittgenstein, "Jeans has written a book called The Mysterious Universe and I loathe it and call it misleading. Take the title...I might say that the title The Mysterious Universe includes a kind of idol worship, the idol being Science and the Scientist."
