= Jeans's theorem =

Mathematic theory

In astrophysics, statistical mechanics and plasma physics, Jeans's theorem, named after James Jeans, states that any steady-state solution of the collisionless Boltzmann equation (also known as the Vlasov equation) depends on the phase space coordinates only through integrals of motion in the given potential, and conversely any function of the integrals is a steady-state solution.

Jeans's theorem is most often discussed in the context of potentials characterized by three, global integrals. In such potentials, all of the orbits are regular, i.e. non-chaotic; the Kepler potential is one example. In generic potentials, some orbits respect only one or two integrals and the corresponding motion is chaotic. Jeans's theorem can be generalized to such potentials as follows:

The phase-space density of a stationary stellar system is constant within every well-connected region.

A well-connected region is one that cannot be decomposed into two finite regions such that all trajectories lie, for all time, in either one or the other. Invariant tori of regular orbits are such regions, but so are the more complex parts of phase space associated with chaotic trajectories. Integrability of the motion is therefore not required for a steady state.

== Mathematical description ==
Consider the collisionless Boltzmann equation for the distribution function $f(\mathbf{x},\mathbf{v},t)$

$$\frac{\partial f}{\partial t} + \mathbf{v}\cdot\nabla f + \frac{1}{m} \mathbf{F}\cdot \nabla_v f = 0.$$

Consider the Lagrangian approach to the particle's motion in which case, the required equations are

$$\frac{d\mathbf{x}}{dt} = \mathbf{v}$$
$$\frac{d\mathbf{v}}{dt} = \frac{\mathbf{F}}{m}.$$

Let the solutions of these equations be

$$\mathbf{x} = \mathbf{x}(\alpha_1,\dots,\alpha_6,t)$$
$$\mathbf{v} = \mathbf{v}(\alpha_1,\dots,\alpha_6,t)$$

where $\alpha_i$s are the integration constants. Let us assume that from the above set, we are able to solve $\alpha_i$, that is to say, we are able to find

$$\alpha_i = \alpha_i(\mathbf{x},\mathbf{v},t).$$

Now consider an arbitrary function of $\alpha_i$'s,

$$f = f(\alpha_1,\dots,\alpha_6).$$

Then this function is the solution of the collisionless Boltzmann equation, as can be verified by substituting this function into the collisionless Boltzmann equation to find

$$\sum_{i=1}^6 \frac{\partial f}{\partial \alpha_i}\left[\frac{\partial \alpha_i}{\partial t} + \mathbf{v}\cdot \nabla \alpha_i + \frac{1}{m}\mathbf{F}\cdot \nabla_v \alpha_i\right] = \sum_{i=1}^6 \frac{\partial f}{\partial \alpha_i} \frac{d\alpha_i}{dt}=0.$$

This proves the theorem.

A trivial set of integration constants are the initial location $\mathbf{x}_0$ and the initial velocities $\mathbf{v}_0$ of the particle. In this case, any function

$$f=f(\mathbf{x}_0(\mathbf{x},\mathbf{v},t),\mathbf{v}_0(\mathbf{x},\mathbf{v},t))$$

is a solution of the collisionless Boltzmann equation.

== See also ==
- Jeans equations
