= Joseph Barrell =

American geologist (1869 – 1919)

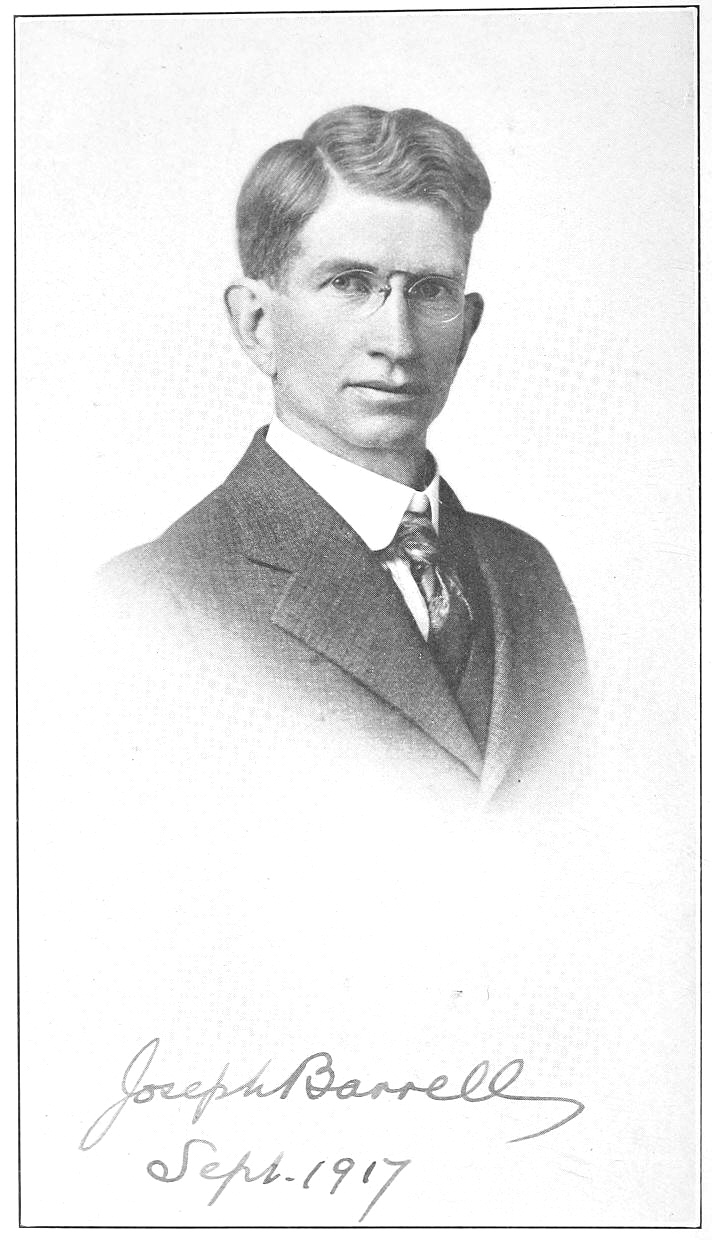
- Joseph Barrell
- Born: December 15, 1869; New Providence, New Jersey, U.S.
- Died: May 4, 1919 (aged 49); New Haven, Connecticut, U.S.
- Scientific career
- Fields: Geology

Joseph Barrell (December 15, 1869 – May 4, 1919) was an American geologist who developed many ideas on the origins of the Earth, isostasy and ideas on the origins of sedimentary rocks. He suggested that they were produced by the action of rivers, winds, and ice (continental), as well as by marine sedimentation. He also independently arrived at the theory of stoping as a mechanism for igneous intrusion. He was elected a Fellow of the American Academy of Arts and Sciences in 1915.

== Life and career ==
The Barrell family originated from a family that migrated from Suffolk in Britain to Boston in 1637. Joseph was born at New Providence on December 15, 1869. His father Henry Ferdinand and his mother Elizabeth née Wisner, of Swiss descent, had owned a farm in Warwick, Orange County, New York before moving to a new farm in New Jersey. Henry Ferdinand was a trustee at the local public library and for the public school and Joseph, the fifth of nine children, grew up in a home surrounded by books. He took a great deal of interest in natural history and astronomy. Joseph went to the local public school until the age of sixteen. he then earned some money teaching at school and later joined Stevens Preparatory School at Hoboken before moving to Lehigh University in 1888. He graduated there and continued studies leading to an MS in 1897. He joined work in the University as an instructor in mining and metallurgy. Barrell taught Geology at Lehigh for three years. He spent a summer in Europe with Herbert E. Gregory and Charles Hyde Warren, travelling on foot, bicycle and third-class trains so as to be able to observe the land and geology with little interest in cities. He married Lena Hopper Bailey in 1902, and in 1903 he was invited by Yale University to develop a course in structural geology. Most of Barrell's key contributions to geology were possible during his time at Yale.

== Contributions to geology ==
Some of Barrell's early work was in applied geology, dealing with the problems of measuring and estimating coal yields in the Lehigh Valley Coal Company (1894). He also worked with the United States Geological Survey to study the Elkhorn Mining District of Montana (1899). Some of the work done here became part of his doctoral dissertation. In 1900 he again worked with the USGS and produced a study "Geology of the Marysville Mining District, Montana: a Study of Igneous Intrusions and Contact Metamorphism." The study of rock metamorphism became a major interest and in 1914 he wrote about the "Relations of Subjacent Igneous Invasions to Regional Metamorphism." Another major advance he made was in the production of marine sediments and his ideas on how to determine ancient shore lines. Another area that he took an interest in was in the origin of the earth. He examined the theories of Chamberlin–Moulton planetesimal hypothesis and questioned the idea that planetesimals grew by very gradual accretion of dust. Barrell suggested that most of the finer sediment on the surface of the earth or under the ocean had been produced by weathering. Barrell's approach to scientific questions was to collect all evidence, generate multiple hypotheses and argue through all hypotheses to look for consistency or the lack of it in explaining other observations. An example of his original thinking was in his examination of the evolution of air-breathing in fishes in the light of evidence for climatic and environmental changes.
