= Harlan H. Barrows =

Harlan Harland Barrows
- Born: April 15, 1877; Armada, Michigan
- Died: May 15, 1960 (aged 83); Highland Park, Illinois
- Education: University of Chicago (B.S.)
- Spouse(s): Janie E. Gleason (1898–1913); Adda B. Weber (m. 1915)
- Parents: David H. Barrows (father); Lucy Elizabeth Tenney (mother)
- Scientific career
- Workplaces: University of Chicago

Harlan H. Barrows (April 15, 1877 – May 15, 1960) was an American geographer. He served as chair of the geography department at the University of Chicago from 1919 until 1942, then was named emeritus professor. He was elected president of the Association of American Geographers in 1922. Barrows played a significant role in the development of historical geography and environmental conservation.

== Biography ==
Barrows was born in Armada, Michigan on April 15, 1877, the son of David H. Barrows and Lucy Elizabeth née Tenney. He graduated from Armada High School at the age of 14, then in 1896 from the Michigan State Normal School in Ypsilanti. Barrows taught history and geography at the Ferris Institute in Big Rapids, Michigan for five years. He was married to his first wife Janie E. Gleason on August 16, 1898. They would have one son, Robert Harlan. Barrows matriculated to University of Chicago where he graduated with a B.S. degree in 1903. He attended graduate school at the same institution during 1903–1906, studying in the newly-formed department of geography – the first in the nation.

During 1904–1907 he was an assistant in geology at the University of Chicago. Barrows was named an instructor in geology and geography in 1907, becoming an assistant professor in 1908, then an associate professor of geography in 1910. His course titled, The Historical Geography of the United States, would become a model for similar courses taught across the country. In 1912 he was awarded a Master of Pedagogy. His wife died on July 23, 1913, then his son in 1919. Barrows was named a professor in 1914. On September 4, 1915, Barrows married his second wife, Adda B. Weber. The couple would have two daughters: Dorothy Elizabeth and Jean. During World War I he served on the United States War Trade Board. In 1919 he was named chair for the University of Chicago department of geography.

During his career, Barrows co-wrote a series of textbooks on geography. In 1922 he was elected as president of the Association of American Geographers. His influential 1922 address to the association, Geography as Human Ecology, helped supplant the then-prevalent school of environmental determinism. Starting in 1933, he served as a consultant in Washington D.C. during the New Deal administration of President Franklin D. Roosevelt. He worked on the Mississippi Valley Committee during 1933–1934, the Water Resources Committee in 1935–1941, and the Northern Great Plains Committee during 1938–1940. Barrows stepped down as chair of the University of Chicago geography department in 1942, then was named emeritus professor. He died at Highland Park, Illinois on May 15, 1960.

== Bibliography ==
These are books authored (or co-authored) by Barrows:

- Barrows, Harlan Harland (1910), Geography of the Middle Illinois Valley, University of Illinois.
- Blackwelder, Eliot; Barrows, Harlan Harland (1911), Elements of Geology, American Book Company.
- Salisbury, Rollin D.; Barrows, Harlan Harland; Tower, Walter Sheldon (1912), Elements of Geography, H. Holt.
- Salisbury, Rollin D.; Barrows, Harlan Harland; Tower, Walter Sheldon (1913), Modern Geography for High Schools, H. Holt.
- Salisbury, Rollin D.; Barrows, Harlan Harland (1918), The Environment of Camp Grant, [Illinois] State Geological Survey.
- Barrows, Harlan H. (March 1923), "Geography as Human Ecology", Annals of the Association of American Geographers, 13 (1): 1–14, doi:10.2307/2560816, JSTOR 2560816.
- Barrows, Harlan Harland; Parker, Edith Putnam (1924), Geography Journeys in Distant Lands, California State Printing Department.
- Barrows, Harlan Harland; Parker, Edith Putnam (1925), Geography, United States and Canada, Silver, Burdett.
- Barrows, Harlan Harland; Parker, Edith Putnam; Parker, Margaret Terrell (1927), Geography, Europe and Asia, Silver, Burdett.
- Barrows, Harlan Harland (1954), Man in His World, An Elementary Geography Program, Gage.
