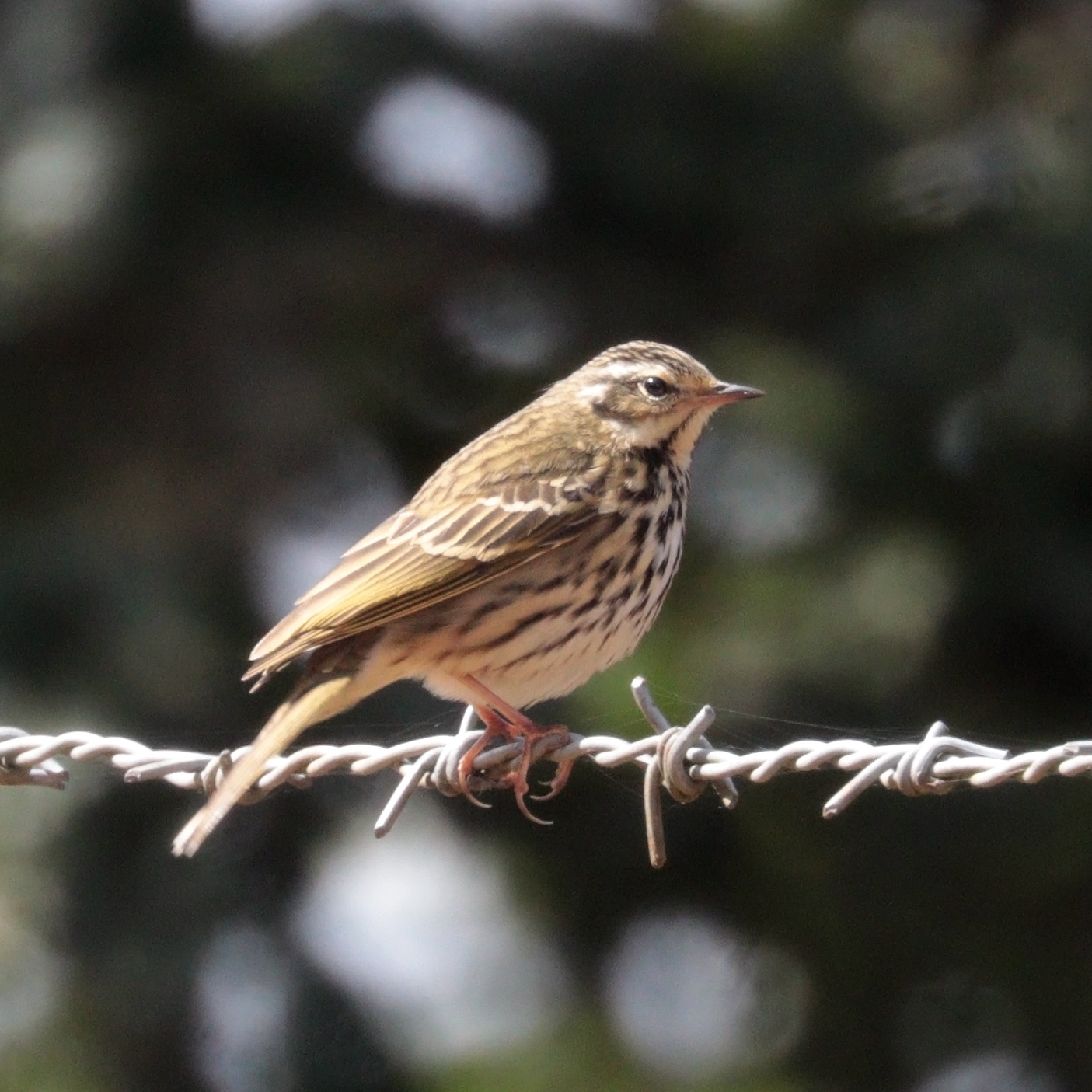
- A. h. hodgsoni Mount Phulchowki, Nepal

Conservation status
- Least Concern (IUCN 3.1)

Scientific classification
- Kingdom: Animalia
- Phylum: Chordata
- Class: Aves
- Order: Passeriformes
- Family: Motacillidae
- Genus: Anthus
- Species: A. hodgsoni

Binomial name
- Anthus hodgsoni Blackwelder, 1907

= Olive-backed pipit =

Species of bird

The olive-backed pipit (Anthus hodgsoni) is a small passerine bird of the pipit (Anthus) genus, which breeds across southern, north central and eastern Asia, as well as in the north-eastern European Russia. It is a long-distance migrant moving in winter to southern Asia and Indonesia. Sometimes it is also called Indian pipit or Hodgson's pipit, as well as tree pipit owing to its resemblance with the tree pipit. However, its back is more olive-toned and less streaked than that species, and its head pattern is different with a better-marked supercilium.

The genus name Anthus is from Latin and is the name for a small bird of grasslands. The specific hodgsoni commemorates English diplomat and collector Brian Houghton Hodgson.

== Distribution ==
- Summer: from Himalayan Pakistan and India, westward through Nepal, into China, north to Gansu province, and eastwards through Korea to Japan, and north through north central Asia into north-eastern Europe (European Russia). Occasionally a rare vagrant in western Europe. Breeds up to 4,500 m (14,800 ft) in eastern Nepal.
- Winter: Broad southern region across Asia, from peninsular India, east to Southeast Asia and the Philippines.
- Habitat: Affects open country. Wintering in evergreen woodland, Summers in groves and wooded biotope.

== Description ==
- Size: Sparrow+ (ca. 15 cm (5.9 in))
- Appearance: Greenish brown streaked with darker brown above. Supercilium, double wingbar and outer rectrices whitish. Whitish to buff below streaked with dark brown on breast and flanks. Sexes alike.
- Habits: Seen singly or pairs. Runs about on the ground in search of food and flies up into trees when disturbed. Flight jerky and undulating.
- Call: Song lark-like and uttered on the wing, similar to the tree pipit, but faster and higher pitched. A single tseep or spek, also similar to the tree pipit.
- Food: Insects, grass and weed seeds.
- Food: Largely insects, but will also take seeds.

== Nesting ==
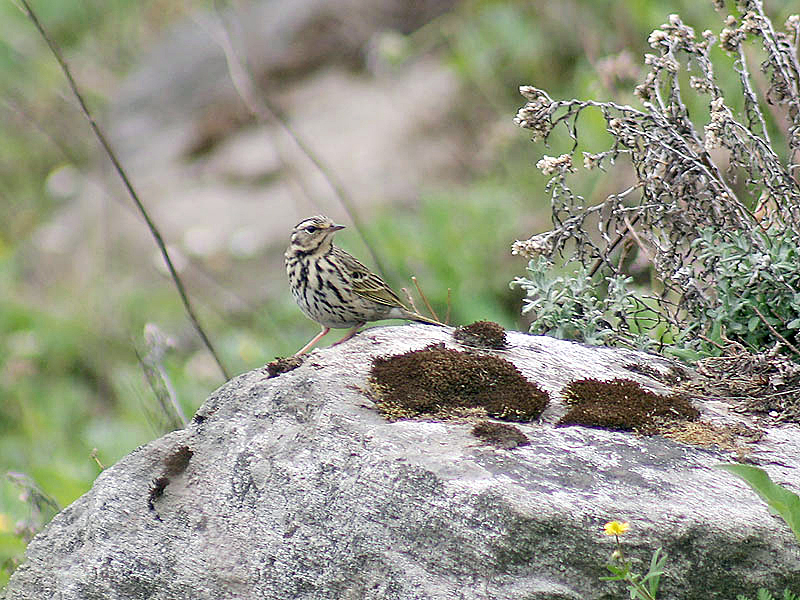
Breeding at Mailee Thaatch (10000 ft) in Kullu - Manali District of Himachal Pradesh, India

- Season: May to July.
- Nest: a cup of moss and grass placed on the ground under a tuft of grass or boulder. open woodland and scrub.
- Eggs: 3–5, usu. 4, dark brown, spotted darker. Usually two broods are raised.
