= Chamberlin (lunar crater) =

Lunar impact crater

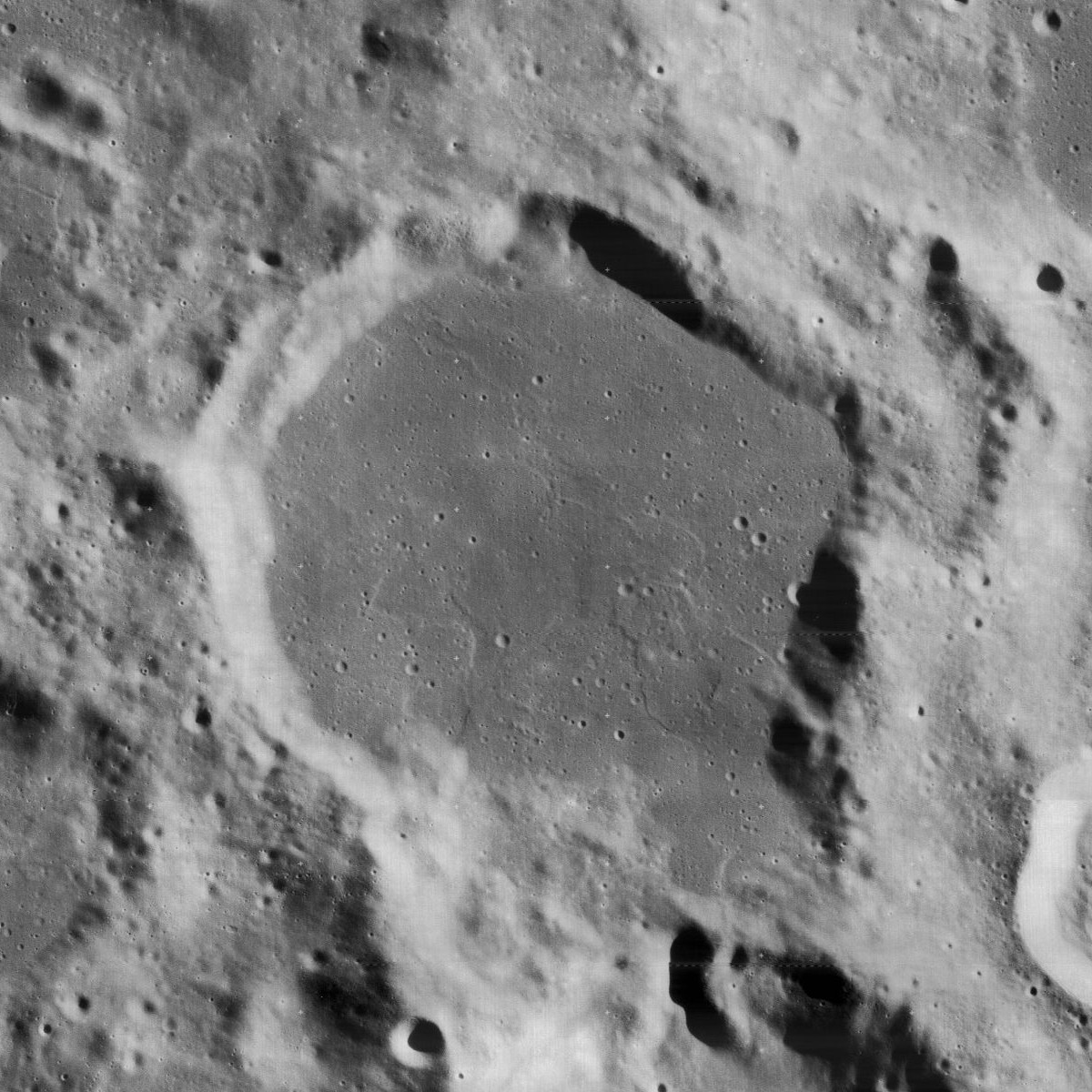
- Lunar Orbiter 4 image
- Coordinates: 58.9°S 95.7°E
- Diameter: 60.41 km (37.54 mi)
- Depth: Unknown
- Colongitude: 266° at sunrise
- Eponym: Thomas C. Chamberlin

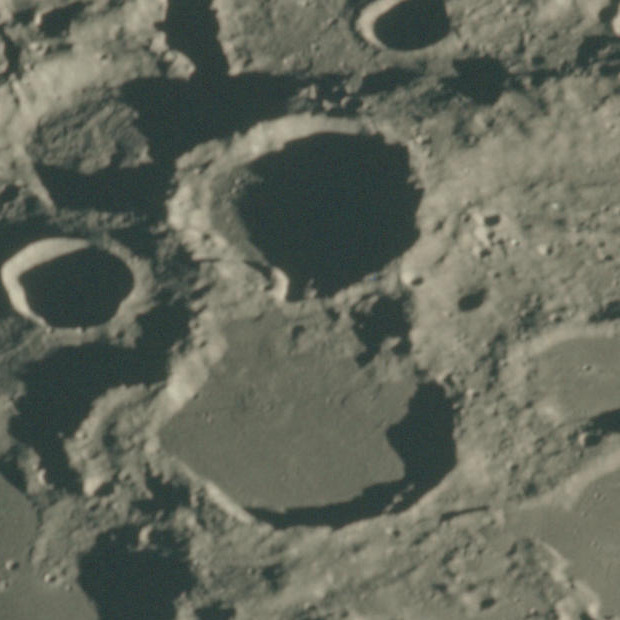
Oblique Apollo 15 image with Moulton above center and Chamberlin below center, facing south

Chamberlin is a lunar impact crater that is located on the far side of the Moon, just past the southeastern limb. It lies to the southeast of the crater Jeans, and Moulton is attached to the southeastern rim of Chamberlin. This crater is located in a part of the lunar surface that has undergone resurfacing of crater interiors, producing dark-hued crater floors.

The outer rim of this formation is somewhat irregular in shape, with outward bulges to the east and southeast. The southern rim has partly disintegrated, and merges with the northwest rim of Moulton. The interior floor of Chamberlin has been flooded by basaltic lava, producing a nearly flat surface with a lower albedo than the typical lunar surface. The interior is otherwise devoid of features of interest, and is marked only by a few tiny craterlets.

This formation is named after American geologist Thomas C. Chamberlin (1843–1928). Its designation was formerly adopted by the International Astronomical Union in 1970.

== Satellite craters ==
By convention these features are identified on lunar maps by placing the letter on the side of the crater midpoint that is closest to Chamberlin.

Chamberlin	Latitude	Longitude	Diameter
D	57.5° S	102.1° E	21 km
H	59.8° S	99.9° E	27 km
R	60.0° S	92.3° E	38 km
