= Strong inference =

Philosophy of science concept emphasizing the need for alternative hypotheses

In philosophy of science, strong inference is a model of scientific inquiry that emphasizes the need for alternative hypotheses, rather than a single hypothesis to avoid confirmation bias.

The term "strong inference" was coined by John R. Platt, a biophysicist at the University of Chicago. Platt notes that some fields, such as molecular biology and high-energy physics, seem to adhere strongly to strong inference, with very beneficial results for the rate of progress in those fields.

== The single hypothesis problem ==
The problem with single hypotheses, confirmation bias, was aptly described by Thomas Chrowder Chamberlin in 1897:

The moment one has offered an original explanation for a phenomenon which seems satisfactory, that moment affection for [one’s] intellectual child springs into existence, and as the explanation grows into a definite theory [one’s] parental affections cluster about [the] offspring and it grows more and more dear .... There springs up also unwittingly a pressing of the theory to make it fit the facts and a pressing of the facts to make them fit the theory... The temptation to misinterpret results that contradict the desired hypothesis is probably irresistible.

Despite the admonitions of Platt, reviewers of grant-applications often require "A Hypothesis" as part of the proposal (note the singular). Peer-review of research can help avoid the mistakes of single-hypotheses, but only so long as the reviewers are not in the thrall of the same hypothesis. If there is a shared enthrallment among the reviewers in a commonly believed hypothesis, then innovation becomes difficult because alternative hypotheses are not seriously considered, and sometimes not even permitted.

== Strong Inference ==
The method, very similar to the scientific method, is described as:

1. Devising alternative hypotheses;
2. Devising a crucial experiment (or several of them), with alternative possible outcomes, each of which will, as nearly as possible, exclude one or more of the hypotheses;
3. Carrying out the experiment(s) so as to get a clean result;
4. Recycling the procedure, making subhypotheses or sequential hypotheses to refine the possibilities that remain, and so on.

The methods of Grey system theory effectively entertain strong inference. In such methods, the first step is the nullification of the single hypothesis by assuming that the true information of the system under study is only partially known.

== Criticisms ==
The original paper outlining strong inference has been criticized, particularly for overstating the degree that certain fields used this method.

== Strong inference plus ==
The limitations of Strong-Inference can be corrected by having two preceding phases:

1. An exploratory phase: at this point information is inadequate so observations are chosen randomly or intuitively or based on scientific creativity.
2. A pilot phase: in this phase statistical power is determined by replicating experiments under identical experimental conditions.

These phases create the critical seed observation (s) upon which one can base alternative hypotheses.
