= Forest Ray Moulton =

American astronomer

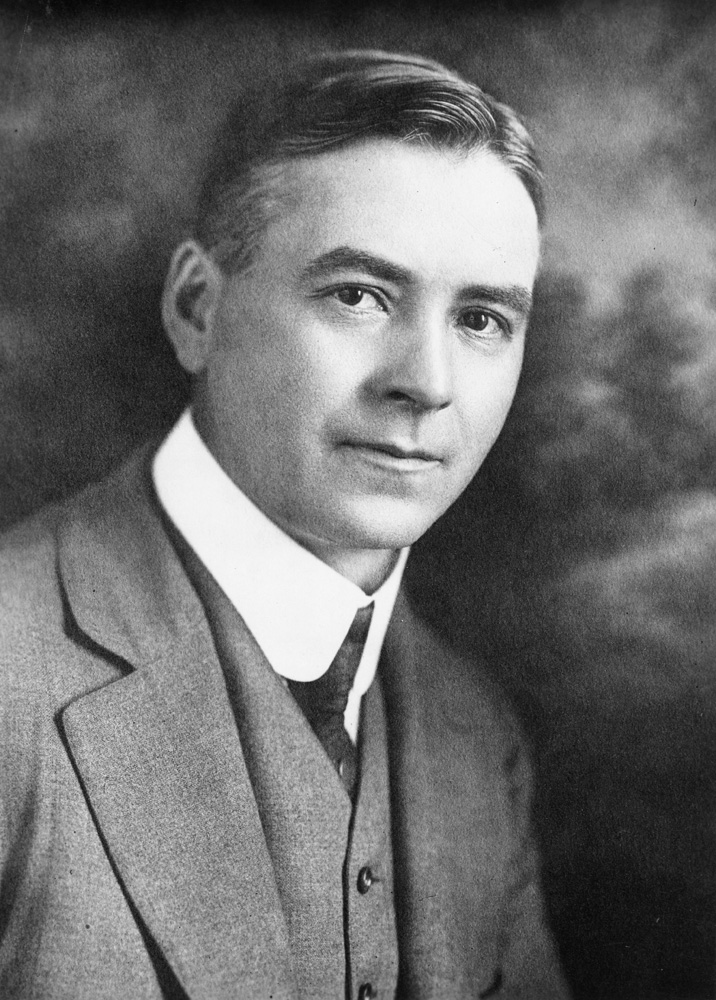
- Born: April 29, 1872; Le Roy, Michigan
- Died: December 7, 1952 (aged 80); Wilmette, Illinois
- Education: University of Chicago
- Scientific career
- Fields: Astronomy
- Doctoral students: Walter Bartky; Edwin Hubble; W. D. MacMillan

Forest Ray Moulton (April 29, 1872 – December 7, 1952) was an American astronomer. He was the brother of Harold G. Moulton, a noted economist.

== Biography ==
He was born in Le Roy, Michigan, and was educated at Albion College. After graduating in 1894 (A.B.), he pursued graduate studies at the University of Chicago and gained a Ph.D. in 1899. At the University of Chicago he was associate in astronomy (1898–1900), instructor (1900–03), assistant professor (1903–08), associate professor (1908–12), and professor after 1912.

He is noted for being a proponent, along with Thomas Chamberlin, of the Chamberlin–Moulton planetesimal hypothesis that the planets coalesced from smaller bodies they termed planetesimals. Their hypothesis called for the close passage of another star to trigger this condensation, a concept that has since fallen out of favor.

In the first decades of the twentieth century, some additional small satellites were discovered to be in orbit around Jupiter. Dr. Moulton proposed that these were actually gravitationally-captured planetesimals. This theory has become well-accepted among astronomers.

Moulton was elected to the United States National Academy of Sciences in 1910, the American Philosophical Society in 1916, and the American Academy of Arts and Sciences in 1919.

The crater Moulton on the Moon, the Adams–Moulton methods for solving differential equations and the Moulton plane in geometry are named after him.

Moulton was a critic of Albert Einstein's theory of relativity.

He was in charge of ballistics at Aberdeen Proving Ground in Maryland during World War I.

According to Craig A. Stephenson:

During the first decades of the 20th century, F. R. Moulton was one of the world's leading mathematical astronomers, and, without doubt, the leading mathematical astronomer in the United States. ... Moulton is today remembered as the author of several introductory books on astronomy, in particular his celebrated text on celestial mechanics; for his role in the formulation of the Chamberlin-Moulton planetesimal hypothesis; and for his work on ballistics in World War I. ... It was in connection with his wartime work on ballistics that he developed the popular method of numerical integration which now bears his name. ... However, for most of his 30-year career at the University of Chicago, it was the three-body problem which held his interest. His research on its periodic solutions began with his 1899 PhD thesis on oscillating satellites and culminated over 20 years later with the publication of his magnum opus the book Periodic Orbits (1920).

== Connection to "Hidden Figures" ==
In September of 1960, Katherine Johnson used Moulton’s book, An Introduction to Celestial Mechanics, to assist her in calculating how John Glenn would return safely to Earth after his orbital flight. This was depicted in the 2016 movie, Hidden Figures.

== Selected publications ==
He became an associate editor of the Transactions of the American Mathematical Society in 1907 and a research associate of the Carnegie Institution in 1908. He served for several terms as secretary of the American Association for the Advancement of Science (AAAS), and edited more than twenty AAAS symposia. Besides various contributions to mathematical and astronomical journals he was the author of:

- An Introduction to Celestial Mechanics (1902; second, revised edition, 1914)
- An Introduction to Astronomy (1906; 2nd, revised edition, 1916)
- Descriptive Astronomy (1912)
- Periodic Orbits (1920)
- New Methods in Exterior Ballistics (1926)
- Differential Equations (1930)
- Astronomy (1931)
- Consider the Heavens (1935)
