= Eliot Blackwelder =

American geologist (1880–1969)

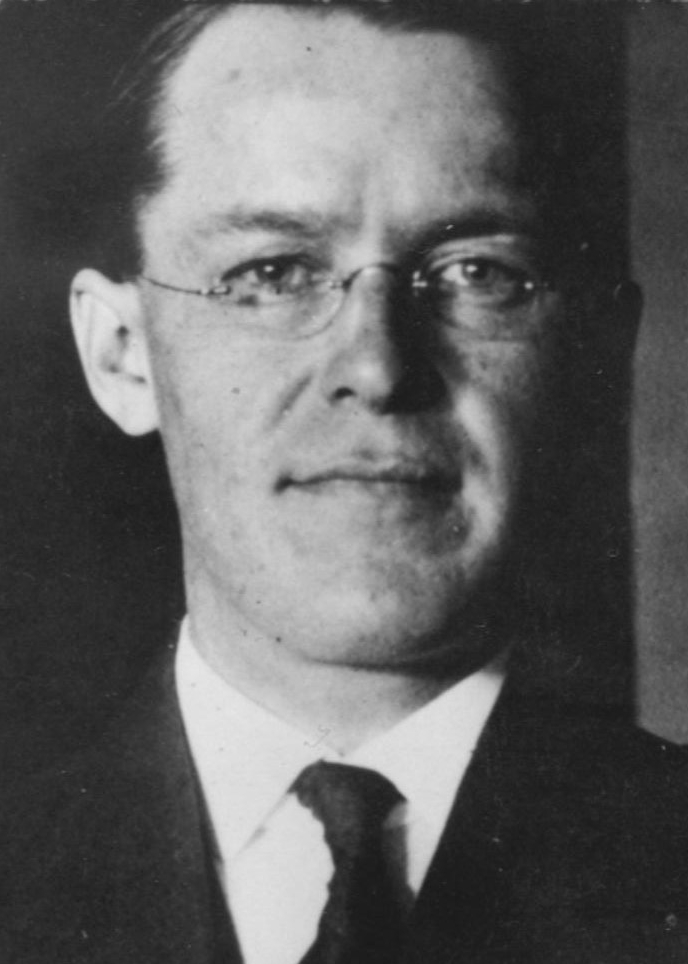
- Born: June 4, 1880; Chicago, Illinois, US
- Died: January 14, 1969 (aged 88); Palo Alto, California, US
- Education: Ph.D. (1914)
- Alma mater: University of Chicago
- Spouse: Jean Otis Bowersock
- Parents: Isaac Simeon Blackwelder (father); Alice Gertrude Boughton (mother)
- Scientific career
- Fields: Geology
- Thesis: Post-cretaceous history of the mountains of central western Wyoming

Eliot Blackwelder (June 4, 1880 – January 14, 1969) was an American geologist and educator. Known primarily as a field geologist, from 1922 to 1945 he was head of the Stanford University department of geology. He served as president of the Geological Society of America in 1940 and of the Seismological Society of America from 1947 to 1949.

== Biography ==
He was born at Chicago, Illinois on June 4, 1880, the son of Isaac Simeon Blackwelder and Alice Gertrude née Boughton. Isaac was an insurance adjuster, then working on claims following the Great Chicago Fire of 1871. Alice was a former instructor at the University of Kansas. Eliot had an older brother, Paul Bruce Blackwelder, born in 1878. As a youth, Eliot developed an interest in entomology, and by the age of 15 he was a member of the American Ornithological Union. He matriculated to the University of Chicago, where he chose geology as his vocation, gaining an A.B in 1901.

Immediately following graduation, he was invited by Rollin D. Salisbury to accompany him on an expedition to the Rocky Mountains. He would join Salisbury again in 1902 as a field assistant to explore glaciation in the Bighorn Mountains. Blackwelder received a fellowship at Chicago and became a geology instructor. From 1902–1903 he was a fellow then an assistant at the University of Chicago. In 1903–1904, he worked as a paleontologist on the Carnegie Institute expedition to China. He was one of the assistants to Bailey Willis, the leader of the expedition. The trip lasted more than a year, crossing Asia, northern China, and ending on the Yangtze River. Much of the region covered was unknown to Western geologists. It resulted in a four volume report, one of which was assembled by Blackwelder. After returning to America, on September 26, 1904, he was married to Jean Otis Bowersock, a childhood friend. The couple would have seven children: two sons and five daughters.

He was offered a position as instructor at the geology department of the University of Wisconsin in 1905. During the following years he became assistant professor then associate professor in geology. Starting in 1906 he became associated with the United States Geological Survey. First he was an assistant geologist in Alaska and southeastern Wyoming during 1906–1908. After 1909 he worked as a geologist performing studies in northern Utah, southeastern Idaho, and western Wyoming. Most of his field work involved stratigraphic and glacial features of these regions, as well as their economic resources. In 1911, he co-authored an elementary textbook titled, Elements of Geology, with Harlan H. Barrows. The same year he was named full professor at Wisconsin, and would remain at the university until 1916.

In 1914 he was awarded a Ph.D. with a thesis titled, Post-cretaceous history of the mountains of central western Wyoming. From June 1916 until August 1916 he was head of the geology department at the University of Illinois. In 1917 he was a member of the California Petroleum Commission, having been appointed by the state governor, William D. Stephens. During 1919 he was a visiting professor at Stanford University, where he taught for a quarter. He became the chief geologist for the East Butte Copper Mining Company in September 1919, remaining there until 1921. In 1921 he was lecturing at Harvard, taking the place of Reginald Aldworth Daly who was on leave. During 1921–1922, he partnered with Lewis A. Parkhurst and George C. Humphrey to establish the Teton Syndicate, where Blackwelder served as a manager. This trust was intended to locate and extract petro-minerals.

In 1922, he was named full professor at Stanford University, filling the chair of the geology department to replace the retiring Bailey Willis. He would remain chair at Stanford until 1945. In 1936, Blackwelde was elected a member of the United States National Academy of Sciences, then he was elected to the American Philosophical Society in 1939. He served as president of the Geological Society of America in 1940, after serving as Vice President in 1933 and 1939. He was elected President of the Seismological Society of America, serving from 1947 to 1949.

During his time at Stanford, Blackwelder made geological explorations of the Sierra Nevada range and its glacial valleys. He explored the arid regions of the southwest, writing papers on the origins and evolution of desert landscapes. He was one of the first geologists to favor an impact origin for the Barringer Crater. After retirement, he served in the Palo Alto chapter of the Atlantic Union Committee. During the final years of his life, his body was weakened from Parkinson's disease. He died on January 14, 1969, surviving his wife by three years. The couple were able to celebrate their 60th wedding anniversary together.

== Bibliography ==
- Blackwelder, Eliot (1907). Research in China, Expedition of 1903-04, Report on Zoology. Carnegie Institution of Washington.
- Blackwelder, Eliot; Smith, Warren DuPré; Iddings, Joseph Paxson (1910). Regional Geology of the United States of North America. C. Winter.
- Blackwelder, Eliot; Barrows, Harlan H. (1911). Elements of Geology. American Book Company.
