= Jeans (lunar crater) =

Moon surface depression

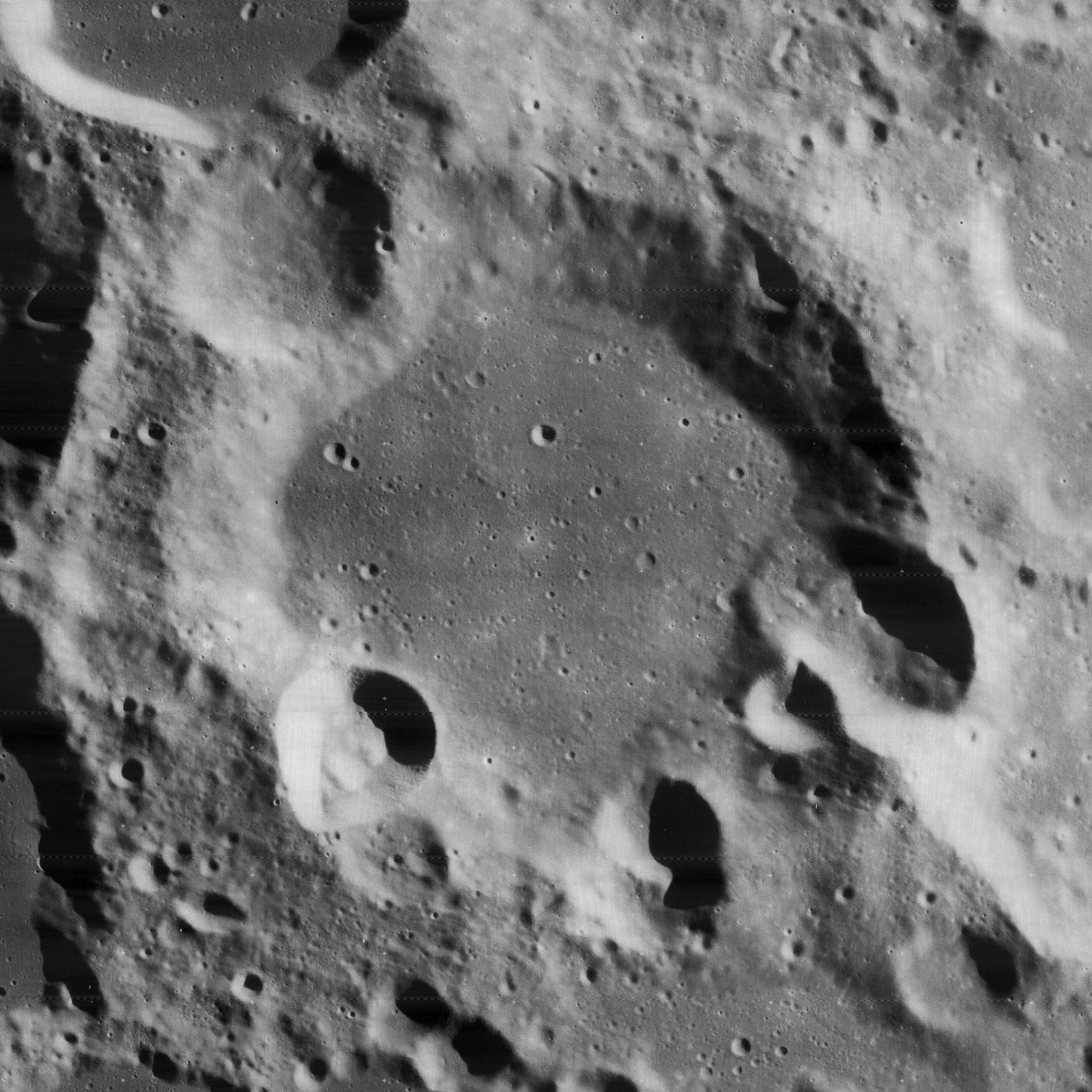
- Lunar Orbiter 4 image
- Coordinates: 55.8°S 91.4°E
- Diameter: 79 km
- Depth: Unknown
- Colongitude: 270° at sunrise
- Eponym: James Jeans

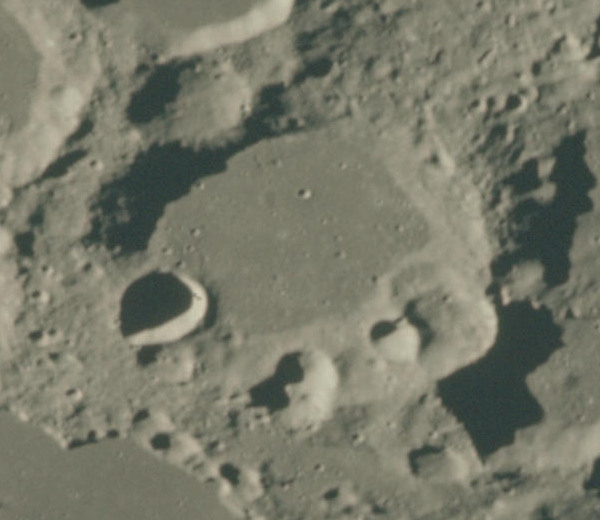
Apollo 15 image

Jeans is a lunar impact crater, on the southeastern limb of the Moon, with its majority lying on the far side. A favorable libration can bring the entire crater into view, but even then the details observable from Earth are very limited as the crater is viewed rather "edge-on".

Jeans is located nearly midway between the much larger walled plain called Lyot on the near side and the crater Chamberlin on the far side. It has a heavily worn and rounded outer rim, and several impacts lie along the southern and southeastern edge and inner wall. The most prominent of these intersecting craters are Jeans G across the eastern rim. The interior floor of the main crater has been resurfaced by basaltic lava, leaving a dark level surface marked only by a few tiny craterlets.

This crater is named after English mathematician and physicist James Jeans (1877–1946).

== Satellite craters ==
By convention these features are identified on lunar maps by placing the letter on the side of the crater midpoint that is closest to Jeans.

Jeans	Latitude	Longitude	Diameter
B	52.4° S	94.8° E	11 km
G	56.0° S	93.3° E	22 km
N	58.7° S	90.5° E	64 km
S	56.8° S	86.8° E	56 km
U	54.7° S	86.5° E	57 km
X	53.5° S	89.4° E	44 km
Y	51.2° S	90.5° E	17 km
