= Thomas Chrowder Chamberlin =

American geologist and educator (1843–1928)

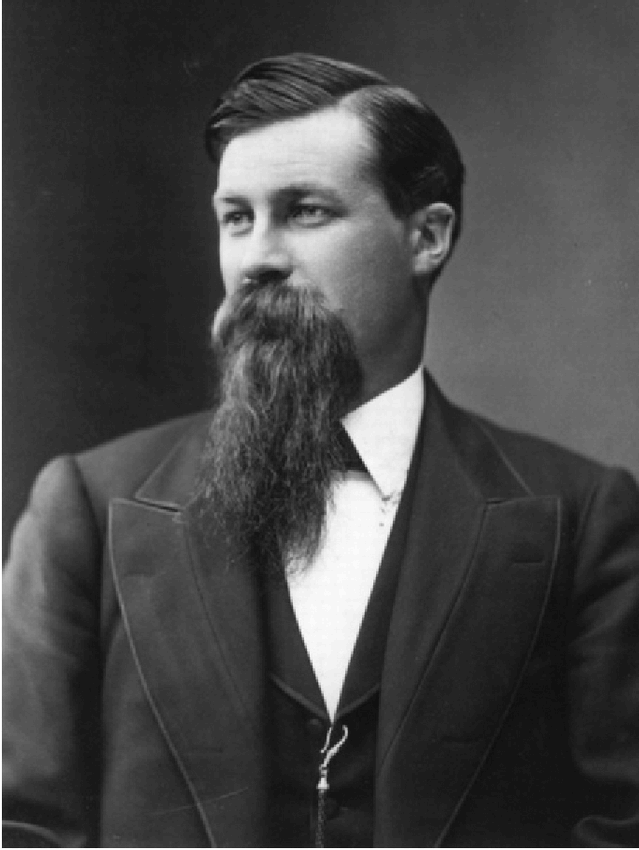
- Chamberlin in the 1870s
- Born: September 25, 1843; Mattoon, Illinois
- Died: November 15, 1928 (aged 85); Chicago, Illinois
- Education: Beloit College (A.B., 1866); University of Michigan
- Known for: Chamberlin–Moulton planetesimal hypothesis
- Children: Rollin Thomas Chamberlin (1881–1948), geologist and skeptic of Wegener's continental drift hypothesis
- Awards: Hayden Memorial Geological Award (1920); Penrose Gold Medal (1924); Penrose Medal (1927)
- Scientific career
- Fields: Geology
- Workplaces: Columbian University; University of Wisconsin; University of Chicago
- Doctoral advisor: Alexander Winchell

Thomas Chrowder Chamberlin (/ˈkraʊdər/; September 25, 1843 – November 15, 1928) was an American geologist and educator. In 1893 he founded the Journal of Geology, of which he was editor for many years.

== Biography ==
Chamberlin was born September 25, 1843, in Mattoon, Illinois. When he was three years old his family moved north to near Beloit, Wisconsin. His father was a Methodist circuit minister and farmer. He attended a preparatory academy before entering Beloit College, where he received a classical education in Greek and Latin, while becoming interested in natural science. While a student at Beloit he directed a church choir and participated in athletics and debate.

After graduation from Beloit College in 1866, Chamberlin worked for two years as a teacher and later principal in a high school near Beloit. He was married to Alma Wilson in 1867.

In 1868–1869, Chamberlin spent a year taking graduate courses, including geology, at the University of Michigan to strengthen his scientific background. Subsequently (1869–1873), he became professor of natural science at Whitewater Normal School in Wisconsin. He joined the Beloit faculty in 1873, where he was professor of geology, zoology, and botany. In 1873 he also became one of several part-time participants in conducting a comprehensive geological survey of Wisconsin. His geological mapping work in southeastern Wisconsin, a region mantled with thick glacial deposits, led him to recognize multiple episodes of glaciation during the Pleistocene. His terminology for glacial stages in North America is still in use, with minor modifications.

In 1875 he started a business with his brother and sold spring water, a popular brand at the time.

In 1876 Chamberlin became chief geologist for the Wisconsin geological survey, supervising the completion of the survey and the publication of the four-volume report, for which he authored sections on glacial deposits, Paleozoic and Precambrian bedrock geology, lead-zinc ore deposits, artesian wells, and soils. The project brought him national attention and led to his appointment as head of the glacial division of the US Geological Survey in 1881. He later was president of the University of Wisconsin (1887 to 1892).

In 1890, and again in 1897, Chamberlin wrote "The method of multiple working hypotheses", in which he advocated the importance of simultaneously evaluating several hypotheses, rejecting those that conflict with available data, and ending with the one hypothesis supported by the data. This stood in contrast to what he called the single ruling theory, which encouraged scientists to find supporting data and not challenge it with difficult tests. The paper is considered a landmark on the scientific method, was an inspiration for the approach called strong inference, and was reprinted in 1965.

In 1892 Chamberlin accepted the offer to organize a department of geology at the new University of Chicago, where he remained as a professor until 1918. From 1898 to 1914 he was president of the Chicago Academy of Sciences.

In 1899 Chamberlin wrote, An Attempt to Frame a Working Hypothesis of the Cause of Glacial Periods on an Atmospheric Basis, and developed at length the idea that changes in climate could result from changes in the concentration of atmospheric carbon dioxide, and wrote about climate actions:

When the temperature is rising after a glacial episode, dissociation is promoted, and the ocean gives forth its carbon dioxide at an increased rate, and thereby assists in accelerating the amelioration of climate.

A study of the life of the geological periods seems to indicate that there were very notable fluctuations in the total mass of living matter. To be sure there was a reciprocal relation between the life of the land and that of the sea, so that when the latter was extended upon the continental platforms and greatly augmented, the former was contracted, but notwithstanding this it seems clear that the sum of life activity fluctuated notably during the ages. It is believed that on the whole it was greatest at the periods of sea extension and mild climates, and least at the times of disruption and climatic intensification. This factor then acted antithetically to the carbonic acid freeing previously noted, and, so far as it went, tended to offset its effects

It now becomes necessary to assign agencies capable of removing carbon dioxide from the atmosphere at a rate sufficiently above the normal rate of supply, at certain times, to produce glaciation; and on the other hand, capable of restoring it to the atmosphere at certain other times in sufficient amounts to produce mild climates.

Chamberlin was elected to the American Academy of Arts and Sciences in 1901 and the United States National Academy of Sciences in 1903.

In 1905, Chamberlin and Forest Ray Moulton developed a theory of the formation of the Solar System that challenged the Laplacian nebular hypothesis. Their theory, the Chamberlin-Moulton planetesimal hypothesis, received favorable support for almost a third of a century, but passed out of favor by the late 1930s. It ultimately was discarded in the 1940s by the realization it was incompatible with the angular momentum of Jupiter. A portion of the theory stating that smaller objects — planetesimals — gradually collided to build the planets by accretion is still well-regarded. From his theories and other geological evidence he concluded that Earth was much older than assumed by Lord Kelvin (ca 100 million years) at the time. His speculations about the source of energy for such a long-lived Sun were prescient, involving the ability of the Sun to somehow extract energy from the inner structures of the atom.

In 1905, Chamberlin was elected to the American Philosophical Society.

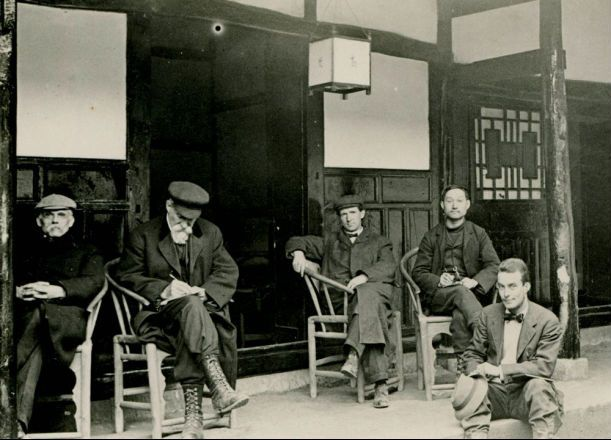
From left to right, E. D. Burton, T. C. Chamberlin, Joseph Beech, Y. T. Wang (interpreter), and R. T. Chamberlin (T. C. Chamberlin's son) at Santai County, Sichuan, during an exploratory trip through China in 1909 as part of the Oriental Educational Investigation Commission.

In 1909, he and his son Rollin Thomas Chamberlin traveled to the East as members of the Oriental Educational Investigation Commission led by Ernest DeWitt Burton, and supported by John D. Rockefeller to reconnoiter the Eastern world as a potential site for the humanitarian projects of the nascent Rockefeller Foundation.

Chamberlin was awarded the inaugural Penrose Gold Medal of the Society of Economic Geologists in 1924, and the inaugural Penrose Medal of the Geological Society of America in 1927. He was president of the Geological Society of America in 1894.

Chamberlin remained active professionally up until his death in Chicago on November 15, 1928.

== Legacy ==
His papers are housed at the University of Chicago archives and the Beloit College archives. The Beloit College archives also contain the papers of his son, Rollin T. Chamberlin (1881-1948), who was also a geologist, and later chaired the geology department at the University of Chicago. There are buildings named for him on the Beloit College and University of Wisconsin–Madison campuses as well as a house in Burton-Judson Courts at The University of Chicago. The lunar crater Chamberlin and a crater on Mars are named in his honor. He is the namesake of Mount Chamberlin in California. A 42 ton rock, a Precambrian glacial erratic, called the Chamberlin Rock sat on Observatory Hill at the University of Wisconsin Madison campus for over 100 years, until 2021 when it was moved to a university property on Lake Kegonsa, a glacial lake.

== Works ==
- Outline of a Course of Oral Instruction (1872)
- Geology of Wisconsin: Survey of 1873-1879 (Contributed and edited second volume in 1877)
- Preliminary paper on the terminal moraine of the second glacial epoch (U.S. Geological Survey, 1882)
- The rock scorings of the great ice invasions (U.S. Geological Survey, 1886)
- Chamberlin, T. C. (1890). "The method of multiple working hypotheses". Science. 15 (366): 92–96. Bibcode:1890Sci....15R..92.. doi:10.1126/science.ns-15.366.92. PMID 17782687. (Reprinted in 1965: Chamberlin, T. C. (May 1965). "The method of multiple working hypotheses: With this method the dangers of parental affection for a favorite theory can be circumvented". Science. 148 (3671): 754–759. Bibcode:1965Sci...148..754C. doi:10.1126/science.148.3671.754. JSTOR 1716334. PMID 17748786. S2CID 7481185.)
- Contribution to the Theory of Glacial Motion (1904)
- With R. D. Salisbury, Geology (three volumes, 1907–09)
- The Origin of the Earth (Chicago: The University of Chicago Press; London: At the Cambridge University Press, 1916.)
- "Biographical Memoir of Thomas Chrowder Chamberlin: 1843-1928". In Biographical Memoirs, vol. 15. Washington: National Academy of Sciences.

== See also ==
- History of climate change science
- Geological Features of Wisconsin
- Ice Age Trail
- Strong inference

Academic offices
Preceded by John Bascom	President of the University of Wisconsin; 1887-1892	Succeeded by Charles K. Adams
