= Sikorsky (crater) =

Lunar surface depression

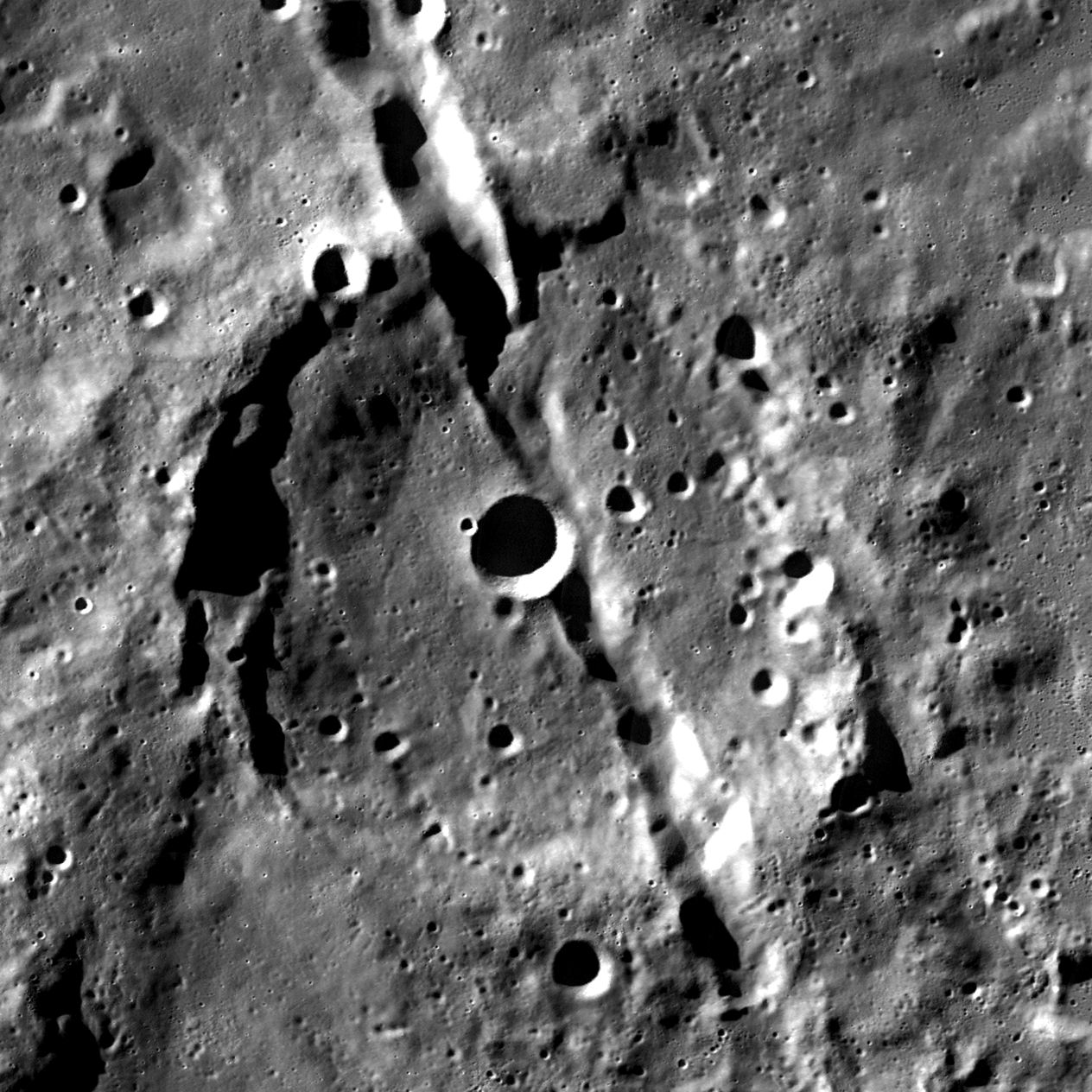
- Lunar Reconnaissance Orbiter image
- Coordinates: 65.89°S 103.65°E
- Diameter: 98 km
- Depth: Unknown
- Colongitude: 260° at sunrise
- Eponym: Igor I. Sikorsky

Sikorsky is a crater on the far side of the Moon. It is situated behind the southeastern limb of the Moon, just out of sight from the Earth. It lies to the northwest of the huge walled plain called Schrödinger. To the northwest is the smaller crater Moulton.

In 1967 the Lunar Orbiter 4 photographed this region in high resolution, discovering a 310-km-long gouge cutting through the middle of Sikorsky. This linear formation is radial to Schrödinger and has since been named the Vallis Schrödinger.

This is a heavily eroded crater formation with a rim that has been worn and rounded by a long history of lesser impacts. In addition to the wide valley mentioned above, there is a lesser cleft that cuts into the eastern rim from the south-southeast. There are also small craterlets along the rim to the east, northeast, and northwest.

Discounting the valley that bisects the floor, the interior surface is relatively level and featureless, with only a few tiny craterlets to mark the surface. At nearly the exact midpoint of the floor, and intruding into the western side of the Vallis Schrödinger, is the almost perfectly bowl-shaped satellite crater Sikorsky Q.

The crater is named after Igor Sikorsky, a Russian-American aviation pioneer.

== Satellite craters ==
By convention these features are identified on lunar maps by placing the letter on the side of the crater midpoint that is closest to Sikorsky.

Sikorsky	Coordinates	Diameter, km
Q	65.79°S 103.45°E	14
