= Stoping (geology) =

Geologic process

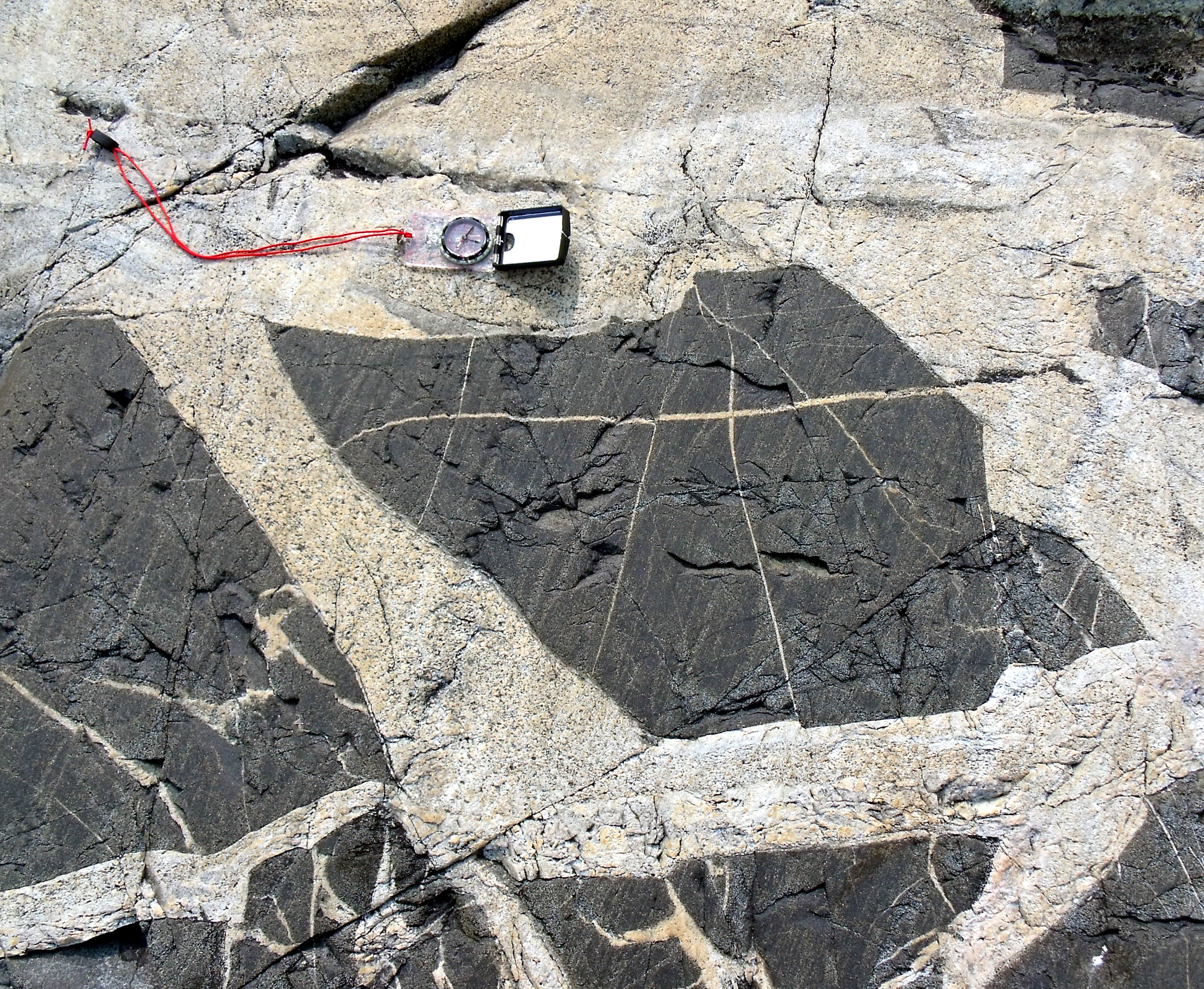
White granite intruding and stoping black basalt at Whale Cove, Nunavut

Stoping is a process accommodating the ascent of magmatic bodies from their sources in the mantle or lower crust to the surface. The theory was independently developed by Canadian geologist Reginald Aldworth Daly and American geologist Joseph Barrell.

The process involves the mechanical disintegration of the surrounding country/host rock, typically through fracturing due to pressure increases associated with thermal expansion of the host rock in proximity of the interface with the melt. After fractures are formed, melt and/or volatiles will typically invade, widening the fracture and promoting the foundering of host rock blocks (i.e. stoped blocks). Once suspended in the melt, stoped blocks may either sink or float depending upon the density of the block relative to that of the melt. Additionally, blocks submerged within melt are subject to further thermally-induced fracturing which may account for the often observed "lack of evidence" for the process of stoping.

== See also ==
- Methods of pluton emplacement
