= Vallis Schrödinger =

Lunar surface depression

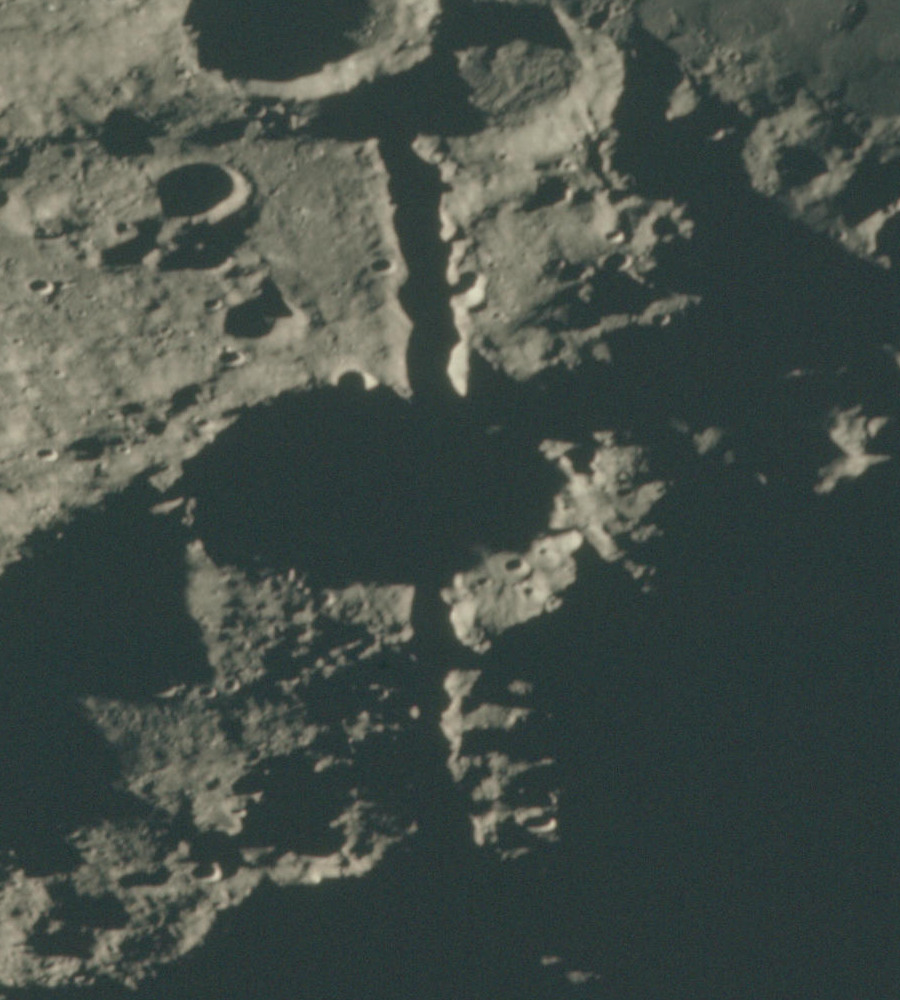
Oblique view from Apollo 15 showing Vallis Schrödinger cutting across Sikorsky crater, while both are at the terminator

Vallis Schrödinger (Latin for "Schrödinger Valley") is a long, nearly linear valley that lies on the far side of the Moon. It is oriented radially to the huge Schrödinger basin and most likely was formed during the original impact that created Schrödinger. The selenographic coordinates of this feature are 67.0°S 105.0°E, and it lies within a diameter of 310 km. It varies in width from 8–10 km. The valley was named after the crater Schrödinger, which itself is named for Erwin Schrödinger.

== Description ==
The valley is shaped like a long groove in the lunar surface. It begins at the outer rampart of ejecta surrounding Schrödinger and continues to the north-northwest until it crosses the rim of the crater Moulton. About mid-way along its length it crosses the crater Sikorsky, and is overlaid in turn by the small satellite crater Sikorsky Q.
