= Rollin D. Salisbury =

American geologist and educator

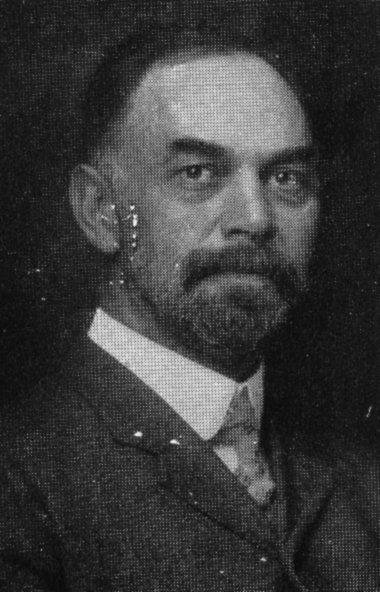
- Born: August 17, 1858; Spring Prairie, Wisconsin
- Died: August 15, 1922 (aged 63)
- Education: Beloit College (B.S., 1881)
- Scientific career
- Fields: Geology
- Workplaces: University of Chicago, United States Geological Survey

Rollin Daniel Salisbury (August 17, 1858 – August 15, 1922) was an American geologist and educator.

== Biography ==
Salisbury was born at Spring Prairie, Wisconsin, in 1858. He studied at Whitewater State Normal School in Whitewater, Wisconsin, graduating in 1877 after completing the four-year course in just two-and-one-half years. He taught in a village school in Port Washington, Wisconsin, for one year before entering Beloit College as a sophomore in the fall of 1878. At Beloit, he studied geology with T.C. Chamberlin as his professor. After graduating from Beloit in 1881, he spent one year working for the U.S. Geological Survey as Chamberlin's field assistant, during which time he lived in the Chamberlin household. After Chamberlin left Beloit in 1882, Salisbury joined the college faculty, becoming an assistant professor in 1882 and full professor and chair of the geology department in 1884, remaining there for several years.

In 1892 he was one of the scholars on the Peary Relief Expedition to Greenland.

After working at the University of Wisconsin–Madison for one year, he was called to the University of Chicago in 1892. At Chicago he became dean of the Ogden Graduate School of Science in 1899, a position he held at the time of his death in 1922. He also organized the university's department of geography in 1903, heading it until 1918. He also served as assistant geologist and geologist for the United States Geological Survey government from 1882 onwards. Salisbury House in the university's housing system (located in the heart of Burton-Judson Courts) shares his namesake.

== Works ==
=== Books ===
- Salisbury, R. D., Kümmel H. B., Peet, C. E. and Knapp, G. N. 1902. The Glacial Geology of New Jersey. Volume V of the Final Report of the State Geologist. Trenton, NJ: MacCrellish & Quigley.
- Chamberlin, T. C. and Salisbury, R. D. 1906. Geology. Three volumes. New York: Henry Holt and Co.
- Salisbury, R. D. 1907. Physiography. New York: Henry Holt.
- Salisbury, R. D. 1910. Elementary Physiography. New York: Henry Holt.
- Willis, B. and Salisbury, R. D. 1910. Outlines of geologic history with especial reference to North America. Chicago: The University of Chicago Press.
- Salisbury, R. D., Barrows, H. H. and Tower, W. S. 1912. The Elements of Geography. New York: Henry Holt.
- Salisbury, R. D., Barrows, H. H. and Tower, W. S. 1913. Modern Geography for High Schools. New York: Henry Holt.
- Chamberlin, T. C. and Salisbury, R. D. 1914. Introductory Geology. New York: Henry Holt and Co..

=== Articles and chapters ===
- Salisbury, R. D. 1884. "Aeolian ripple-marks". Science 3(54):172.
- Chamberlin, T. C. and Salisbury, R. D. 1885. "Preliminary paper on the driftless area of the upper Mississippi Valley". In: Powell, J.W. (ed), Sixth Annual Report of the United States Geological Survey to the Secretary of the Interior, 1884-1885, pp. 199–322.
- Chamberlin, T. C. and Salisbury, R. D. 1891. "On the relationship of the Pleistocene to the pre-Pleistocene formations of the Mississippi Basin, south of the limit of glaciation". The American Journal of Science, 3rd Series, 41(245):359-377.
- Salisbury, R. D. 1892. "Certain extra-morainic drift phenomena of New Jersey". Bulletin of the Geological Society of America 3:173-182.
- Salisbury, R. D. 1892. "On the northward and eastward extension of the pre-Pleistocene gravels of the Mississippi basin". Bulletin of the Geological Society of America 3:183-186.
- Salisbury, R. D. 1894. "Studies for students: Superglacial drift". The Journal of Geology 2(6):619-632.
- Salisbury, R. D. 1895. "Pre-glacial gravels on the quartzite range near Baraboo, Wisconsin". The Journal of Geology 3:655-667.
- Salisbury, R. D. 1895. "Report on Surface Geology for 1894" from the Annual Report of the State Geologist of New Jersey for the year 1894. Trenton, NJ: The John L. Murphy Pub. Co. Printers, 149 pp.
- Salisbury, R. D. 1895. "The Arctic Expedition of 1895, and Lieutenant Peary's work". Science NS 2(41):457-460.
- Salisbury, R. D. 1896. "Loess in the Wisconsin drift formation". The Journal of Geology 4(8):929-937.
- Salisbury, R. D. 1896. "The Philadelphia brick clays". Science NS 3(65):480-481.
- Salisbury, R. D. 1896. "Volcanic ash in southwestern Nebraska". Science NS 4(101):816-817.
- Salisbury, R. D. 1897. "On the origin and age of the relicbearing sand at Trenton, N.J." Science NS 6(157):977-981.
- Salisbury, R. D. and Atwood, W.W. 1897. "Drift phenomena in the vicinity of Devils Lake and Baraboo, Wisconsin". The Journal of Geology 5:131-147.
- Salisbury, R. D. 1898. "The Physical Geography of New Jersey". In Final report of the state geologist.. Trenton, NJ: The John L. Murphy Pub. Co. Printers, pp. 161–167.
- Salisbury, R. D. and Alden, W. C. 1899. "The Geography of Chicago and Its Environs". Geographic Society of Chicago Bulletin No. 1, 64 pp.
- Salisbury, R. D. and Atwood, W. W. 1900. "The geography of the region about Devils Lake and the Dalles of the Wisconsin". Wisconsin Geological and Natural History Survey Bulletin No. 5.
- Salisbury, R. D. 1901. "Glacial work in the western mountains in 1901". The Journal of Geology 9:718-731.
- Salisbury, R. D. 1901. "The surface formations in southern New Jersey". New Jersey Geological Survey, Annual Report for 1900, pp. 33–40.
- Salisbury, R. D. 1902. "Recent progress in glaciology". Science NS 15(374):353-355.
- Salisbury, R. D. 1904. "Three new physiographic terms". The Journal of Geology 12:707-715.
- Salisbury, R. D. 1905. "The mineral matter of the sea, with some speculations as to the changes which have been involved in its production". The Journal of Geology 13:469-484.
- Salisbury, R. D. 1905. "The mineral matter of the sea". The Scottish Geographical Magazine 21:132-136.
- Salisbury, R. D. 1906. "Glacial geology of the Bighorn Mountains". United States Geological Survey, Professional Paper 51, pp. 71–90.
- Salisbury, R. D. 1906. "Glacial geology of the Cloud Peak and Fort McKinney quadrangles Wyoming". In United States Geological Survey, Geologic Atlas of the United States, Folio 142, pp. 9–12.
- Salisbury, R. D. 1906. "The Illinois geological survey". The Journal of Geology 14(1):65-87.
- Salisbury, R. D. and Atwood, W. W. 1908. "The interpretation of topographic maps ". United States Geological Survey, Professional Paper 60, 84 pp.
- Salisbury, R. D. 1918. "Geology in education". Science NS 47(1214):325-335.
