= Moulton (crater) =

Lunar surface depression

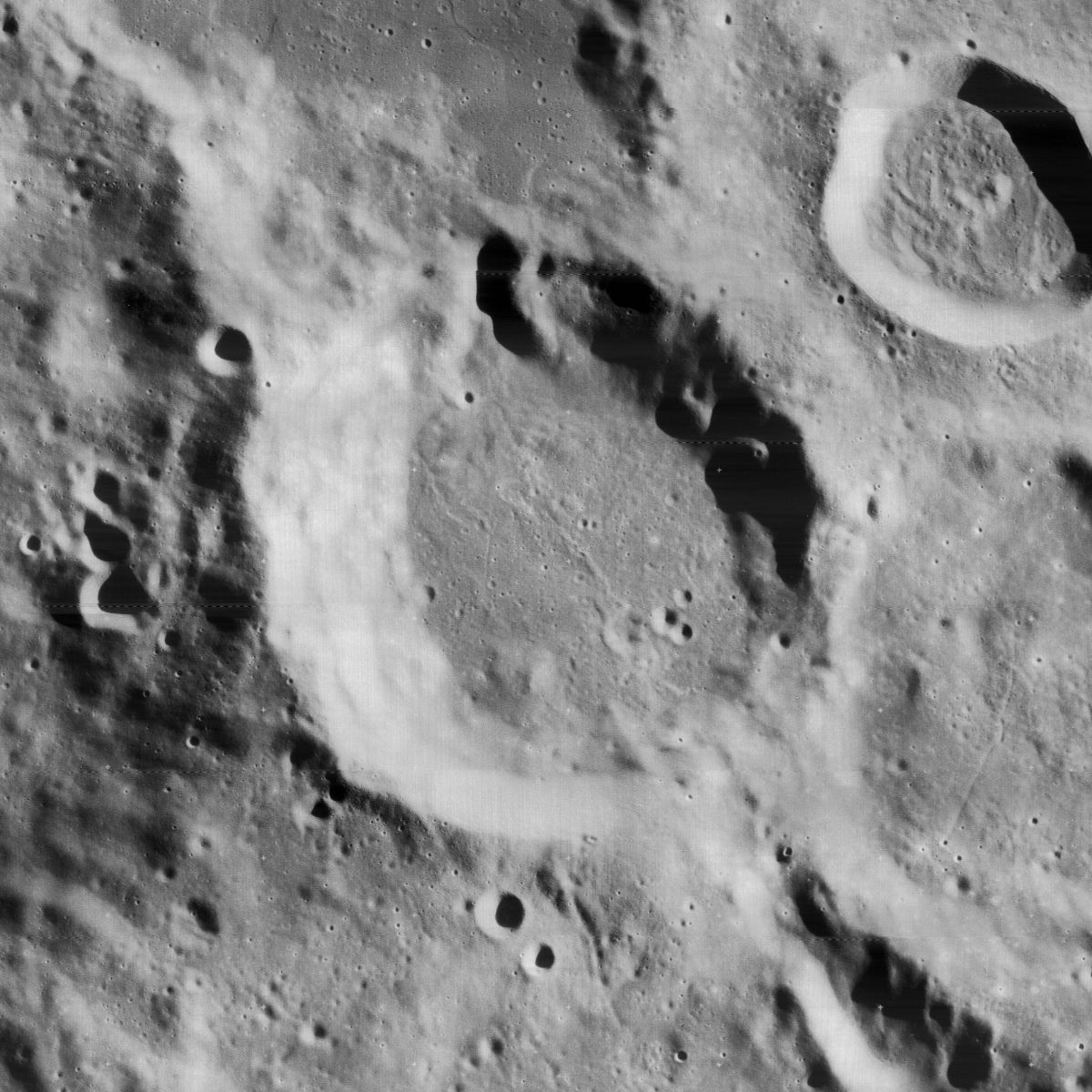
- Lunar Orbiter 4 image
- Coordinates: 61.1°S 97.2°E
- Diameter: 49 km
- Depth: Unknown
- Colongitude: 264° at sunrise
- Eponym: Forest R. Moulton

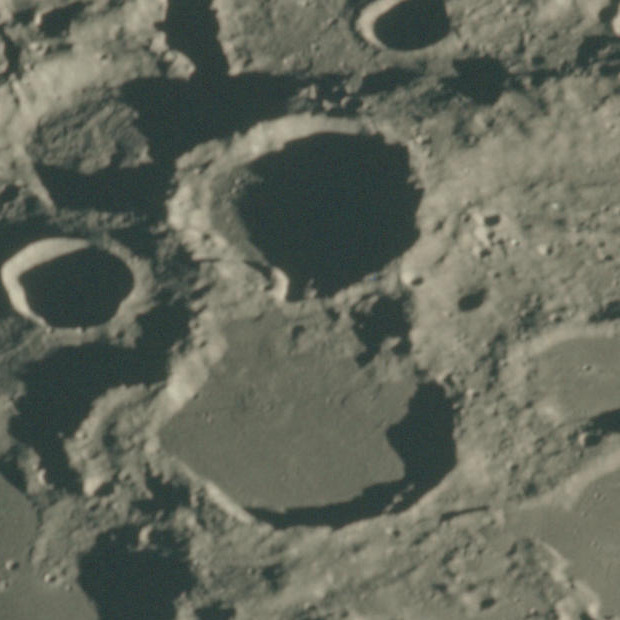
Oblique Apollo 15 image with Moulton above center and Chamberlin below center, facing south

Moulton is a crater on the Moon's far side, just beyond the south-southwestern limb as seen from the Earth. The crater is attached to the southern edge of Chamberlin, and it lies at the northern terminus of the Vallis Schrödinger. There is a cleft in the shared rim between Chamberlin and Moulton.

This is a worn crater with an outer rim that is not quite circular. There are straight lengths in the rim to the west and northeast, as well as the common rim shared with Chamberlin to the north. Attached to the eastern outer rim is the satellite crater Moulton H. The interior floor has been resurfaced, although the albedo is not as low as the lava-flooded interior of Chamberlin. There are no craters of note on Moulton's rim or within the interior.

== Satellite craters ==
By convention these features are identified on lunar maps by placing the letter on the side of the crater midpoint that is closest to Moulton.

Moulton	Latitude	Longitude	Diameter
H	61.5° S	100.6° E	44 km
P	63.9° S	93.5° E	14 km
