= Chamberlin–Moulton planetesimal hypothesis =

The Chamberlin–Moulton planetesimal hypothesis was proposed in 1905 by geologist Thomas Chrowder Chamberlin and astronomer Forest Ray Moulton to describe the formation of the Solar System. It succeeded French astronomer Pierre-Simon Laplace's nebular hypothesis, which had prevailed since the 19th century.

According to the Chamberlin–Moulton hypothesis, the Solar System was formed from a spiral nebula (not yet understood to be a type of galaxy). The nebula was thought to have cooled, causing it to rotate faster and bulge at the sides until it flattened. Two opposed streams of material were theoretically ejected, condensing into billions of stars, including the Sun. Then, a star passed close enough to the Sun to cause tidal bulges to rise up to 160,000 kilometres (100,000 miles) from its surface, which along with the internal process that leads to solar prominences, caused material to be ejected repeatedly from the Sun. Due to the gravitational effects of the passing star, two spiral-like arms would have extended from the Sun, and while most of the material would have fallen back, part of it would remain in orbit. This orbiting material would cool and condense into numerous small bodies that they termed planetesimals and a few larger protoplanets. Their theory proposed that as these objects collided over time, the planets and their moons were built up, with comets and asteroids being the leftover debris. The "spiral nebulae" photographed at Lick Observatory were thought to possibly be views of other suns undergoing this process.

In 1917, James Hopwood Jeans argued that only a very close approach of a second star was necessary to eject material, instead of requiring solar prominences. In 1939, Lyman Spitzer showed that a column of material drawn out from the Sun would dissipate rather than condense. By this time the theory had mostly fallen out of favor, and in the 1940s, the work of Henry Norris Russell showed that if the solar material had been pulled away from the Sun with the force necessary to account for the angular momentum of Jupiter, the material would have continued out of the solar system entirely.

Though the Chamberlin–Moulton hypothesis is no longer accepted, the idea of planetesimals remains in modern theory.
