= The Journal of Geology =

- Discipline: Geology
- Language: English

Publication details
- History: 1893-2026
- Publisher: University of Chicago Press for the Department of the Geophysical Sciences, University of Chicago (United States)
- Frequency: Ceased publication
- Impact factor: 2.015 (2017)

Standard abbreviations
- ISO 4: J. Geol.

Indexing
- ISSN: 0022-1376

Links
- Journal homepage

The Journal of Geology published research on geology, geophysics, geochemistry, sedimentology, geomorphology, petrology, plate tectonics, volcanology, structural geology, mineralogy, and planetary sciences. Its content ranged from planetary evolution to computer modeling of fossil development, which made it relevant to geologists as well as other researchers working in the Earth or planetary sciences.

It was established in 1893 by Thomas Chrowder Chamberlin. Citing the rise of specialty journals leading to fewer submissions and the difficulties building a sustainable publication model, it ceased publication with the September-December 2024 issue, published in 2026.
