= Cornelius Lanczos =

Hungarian-American mathematician (1893–1974)

- Lanczos in 1947
- Born: February 2, 1893; Székesfehérvár, Austria-Hungary
- Died: June 25, 1974 (aged 81); Budapest, Hungary
- Education: University of Budapest; University of Szeged
- Known for: Lanczos algorithm; Lanczos tensor; Lanczos resampling; Lanczos approximation; Lanczos sigma factor; Lanczos differentiator; Lanczos–van Stockum dust
- Spouses: Mária Erzsébet Rump (1928–1939); Ilse Hildebrand (1954–1974)
- Awards: Chauvenet Prize (1960)
- Scientific career
- Fields: Mathematics; Theoretical physics
- Workplaces: University of Freiburg; Frankfurt University; Purdue University; Boeing; National Bureau of Standards; Dublin Institute for Advanced Studies
- Thesis: Relation of Maxwell's Aether Equations to Functional Theory (1921)
- Doctoral advisor: Rudolf Ortvay
- Other academic advisors: Loránd Eötvös; Lipót Fejér; Erwin Madelung

Cornelius (Cornel) Lanczos (Hungarian: Lánczos Kornél, pronounced [ˈlaːnt͡soʃ ˈkorneːl]; born as Kornél Lőwy, until 1906: Löwy (Lőwy) Kornél; February 2, 1893 – June 25, 1974) was a Hungarian, American, and later Irish mathematician and physicist. According to György Marx he was one of the Martians, a group of Hungarian scientific luminaries who immigrated to the United States to escape national socialism. He was remembered by his colleagues as an innovative scholar and an excellent educator.

== Early life and education ==
He was born in Székesfehérvár, Fejér County, Kingdom of Hungary, Austria-Hungary to Károly Lőwy and Adél Hahn. He grew up in relative comfort and attended a Catholic Gymnasium (high school). Between 1911 and 1916, he studied at the University of Budapest, where one of his professors in physics was Roland Eötvös, whose skills as an experimental physicist impressed him. In mathematics, his notable teacher was Lipót Fejér, then a young mathematician. Lanczos graduated with a teacher's diploma in mathematics and physics. He worked an assistant of Károly Tangl at the Department of Experimental Physics at the Polytechnical University of Budapest from 1916 to 1921.

In his doctoral dissertation titled The Relation of Maxwell's Aether Equations to Functional Theory, Lanczos re-wrote Maxwell's equations of electromagnetism in terms of quaternions and applied a relativistic variational principle. He sent a copy of his thesis to Albert Einstein, who replied, "I studied your paper as far as my present overload allowed. I believe I may say this much: this does involve competent and original brainwork, on the basis of which a doctorate should be obtainable... I gladly accept the honorable dedication." Lanczos maintained his contact with Einstein for another 35 years, until the latter's death. In 1921, Lanczos completed his Ph.D. training at the University of Szeged under the supervision of Rudolf Ortvay, a former student of Arnold Sommerfeld. While Ortvay was not distinguished as a researcher, he was an inspirational teacher who brought modern physics to Hungary.

== Career ==
As a consequence of the restrictions from the new right-wing regime in Hungary, Lanczos moved to Germany in search of employment. From 1921 to 1924, Lanczos served as a lecturer at the University of Freiburg. In 1924 he discovered an exact solution to the Einstein field equations of general relativity representing a cylindrically symmetric rigidly rotating configuration of dust particles. This was later rediscovered by Willem Jacob van Stockum in 1938. It is one of the simplest known exact solutions in general relativity and is regarded as an important example, in part because it exhibits closed timelike curves.

Lanczos worked at the University of Frankfurt from 1924 to 1931, delivering lectures for Erwin Madelung as a Privatdozent. He also briefly served as assistant to Albert Einstein in Berlin during the academic year 1928–29,upon invitation by the latter. It was Leo Szilard who recommended him to Einstein. Einstein wrote to Madelung, requesting a leave of absence for Lanczos, which was granted. Before leaving for Berlin, Lanczos wrote to Einstein that Hans Bethe was being considered as his temporary replacement. By the time he went to work with Einstein, Lanczos had already written multiple papers on relativity. In Berlin, Lanczos examined the motion of singularities—meaning, particles—in curved spacetime as described by general relativity. Einstein had a high opinion of Lanczos for his mathematical skills. In this capacity, Lanczos replaced Marcel Grossmann as Einstein's collaborator, helping him with the difficult mathematics of general relativity. Although Einstein and Lanczos published no papers together, Einstein referred to the works of Lanczos in one of his subsequent articles on distant parallelism. Another innovation of Lanczos in this context was harmonic coordinates, which he introduced independently of Théophile De Donder. These were later used by Yvonne Choquet-Bruhat in her proof of the local existence and uniqueness of solutions to the Einstein field equations in vacuum with initial values and in algorithms of numerical relativity that simulate the spiral and merger of binary systems of compact objects, which emit gravitational waves.

Following the seminal publication of Werner Heisenberg announcing the creation of his matrix formulation of quantum mechanics in 1925, Lanczos wrote a paper demonstrating how the new theory could be expressed in terms of linear integral equations. However, at the time, this paper had little impact, in part because physicists were more used dealing with differential equations. Erwin Schrödinger published a series of papers detailing his own undulatory version of quantum theory, which proved rather popular among physicists. But Lanczos' paper made it clear that the two seemingly different formulations of quantum mechanics were in fact equivalent, something Schrödinger himself later proved. Carl Eckart independently reached the same conclusion, based on the work of Lanczos. This paper also helped Paul Dirac create his own formulation of quantum mechanics as a theory of linear transformations. Lanczos's 1926 paper was the earliest continuum-theoretic formulation of quantum mechanics; it was close to the notion of a quantum field. Moreover, Lanczos was willing to accept the probabilistic interpretation of the wave function. In 1972, at an event organized by the European Physical Society in Trieste, Italy, Bartel Leendert van der Waerden publicly recognized the significance of that paper, which correctly formulated the eigenvalue problem in terms of integration and even came close to introducing the Dirac $\delta$-distribution. But van der Waerden was unaware that Lanczos was in the audience until Léon Rosenfeld urged the latter to come to the stage.

In 1927 Lanczos married Maria Rupp. He moved to the United States in 1931. Mindful of the Great Depression, he turned his attention towards applied mathematics. He began conducting research in numerical analysis, and developed a number of concepts in service of early digital computers. He served as a professor of mathematics and aeronautical engineering at Purdue University from 1931 to 1946. Between 1927 and 1939, Lanczos split his life between two continents. His wife Maria Rupp, who had contracted tuberculosis, stayed with Lanczos' parents in Székesfehérvár year-around while Lanczos went to Purdue for half the year, teaching graduate students matrix mechanics and tensor analysis. His lecture notes on quantum mechanics examined in detail its mathematical formulation, including topics in function space and group theory. At Purdue, he introduced an "experimental" curriculum for female students.

In 1933 his son Elmar was born; Elmar came to Lafayette, Indiana with his father in August 1939, just before the Second World War broke out. Maria died in 1938, the same year Lanczos became an American citizen. His father died the following year. After the War, he left Purdue and moved to Seattle, working for the Boeing Aircraft Company and the University of Washington. Between 1949 and 1952, Lanczos worked for the National Bureau of Standards (now the National Institute of Standards and Technology) Institute for Numerical Analysis at the University of California at Los Angeles (UCLA). There, he participated in the Mathematical Tables Project.

In 1942, Lanczos and Gordon Charles Danielson developed a practical technique in Fourier analysis, now known as the fast Fourier transform (FFT). But the significance of his discovery was not appreciated at the time, partly because there were no machines to execute this algorithm, and today the FFT is credited to J. W. Cooley and John Tukey, who published the Cooley–Tukey algorithm in 1965. (As a matter of fact, similar claims can be made for several other mathematicians, including Carl Friedrich Gauss.) The FFT was implemented on a digital computer for the first time in 1966.

Working in at the U.S. National Bureau of Standards in the District of Columbia after 1949, Lanczos developed a number of techniques for mathematical calculations using digital computers, such as the Lanczos algorithm for determining the eigenvalues of large Hermitian matrices.

In 1949, Lanczos showed that the Weyl tensor, which plays a fundamental role in general relativity, can be obtained from a tensor potential now called the Lanczos potential.

In 1952, Lanczos examined the utility of the Chebyshev polynomials in approximating the solution of linear systems.

During the McCarthy era, Lanczos came under suspicion for possible communist links. In 1955, he accepted an invitation from Éamon de Valera, then the Prime Minister of Ireland, and moved to the School of Theoretical Physics at the Dublin Institute for Advanced Studies, where his colleagues included Schrödinger and John Lighton Synge. Shortly after arriving he gave lectures on numerical methods, such as a new approximation for the gamma function he developed. He remained there until his death in 1974. He wrote many scientific papers and books during this period; he also became interested in some newly developed ideas in mathematical physics, notably Schwartz distributions and Sobolev spaces. Despite being a victim of Joseph McCarthy, Lanczos still referred to the United States as his "dream land" on conversations with those he knew.

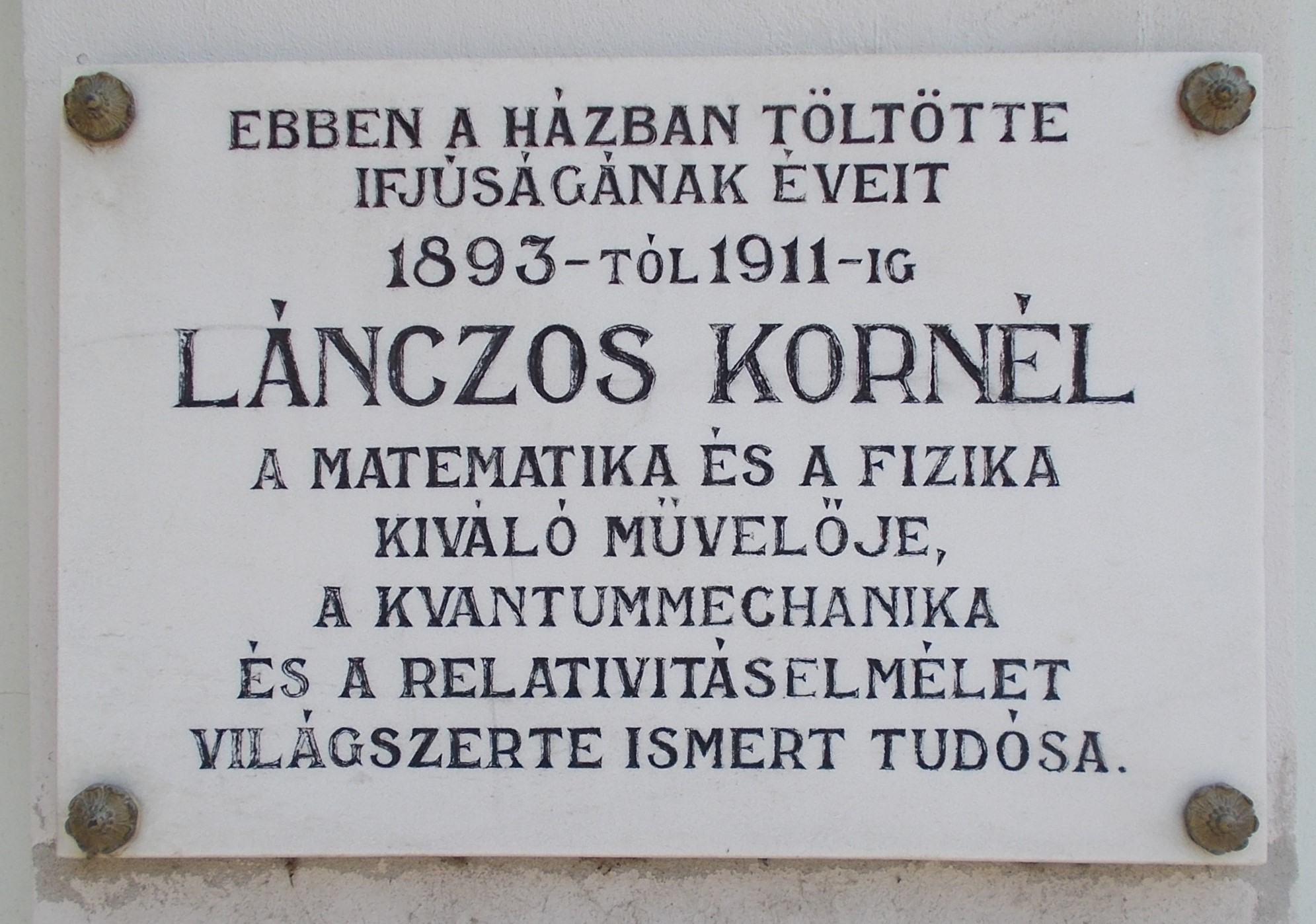
A commemorative plaque at the childhood home of Lanczos. The inscription reads: "Kornél Lánczos spent the years of his youth in this house from 1893 to 1911, an excellent practitioner of mathematics and physics, a world-renowned scientist of quantum mechanics and relativity."

In 1960, he won the Chauvenet Prize from the Mathematical Association of America (MAA) for a paper explaining how to decompose an arbitrary rectangular matrix into three, the middle of which is diagonal and the other two orthogonal. This technique is now recognized as singular value decomposition, of use in computer science and computational mathematics.

Lanczos resampling is based on a windowed sinc function as a practical upsampling filter approximating the ideal sinc function, now widely used in video up-sampling for digital zoom applications and image scaling. It was invented by Claude Duchon, who named it after Lanczos due to Duchon's use of the sigma approximation in constructing the filter, a technique created by Lanczos.

During his career, he was invited to lecture of various topics of mathematical physics at many different institutions. he maintained contact with his doctoral supervisor Ortvay before the War, and occasionally returned to Budapest to lecture on various topics, such as the Stark effect (1930) and Hamilton's principle and canonical equations in classical mechanics (1933). Throughout his life, Lanczos maintained his conviction that mathematics should not be separated from its history; he lectured on this topic with great enthusiasm.

In 1974, he published a paper on the vector potential in curved spacetime. He died in Budapest that same year of a sudden heart attack during a summer visit. His collected works, six volumes in all, are held at North Carolina State University in collaboration with the Eötvös Physical Society in Budapest. He was of sound mind up until the day he died, when he was working on the Fourier analysis of random sequences, a topic he was scheduled to lecture on in Dublin in July that year.

== Publications ==
=== Books ===
- The Variational Principles of Mechanics (4th ed.). University of Toronto Press. 1970. ISBN 0-486-65067-7. Dedicated to Albert Einstein. This is a graduate text on mechanics. He published it shortly after moving to Los Angeles. In the preface of the first edition (1949) it is described as a two-semester graduate course of three hours weekly. The second edition (1962) contains a new chapter on relativistic mechanics and the third (1966) has an appendix on Noether's theorem for cyclic coordinates. In the fourth edition (1970), Lanczos discusses at length continuum mechanics and makes further use of Noether's theorem.
- Applied Analysis. Prentice Hall. 1956. Reprinted 2010 by Dover Publications. ISBN 978-0-486-65656-4. An exposition of his investigations of ideas in the boundary between classical and numerical analysis illustrated by worked examples, topics covered include large scale linear systems, harmonic analysis, data analysis, numerical quadrature and power series expansions. The chapter on numerical quadrature was inspired by a number of problems posed by Schrödinger.
- Linear Differential Operators. Van Nostrand. 1961. OCLC 1213191.
- Albert Einstein and the Cosmic World Order. Interscience Publishers. 1965. OCLC 530604. Based on six lectures delivered at the University of Michigan in the spring of 1962.
- Discourse on Fourier Series. Edinburgh: Oliver & Boyd. 1966. OCLC 1222573. This book was written for advanced undergraduates and graduate students in mathematics, physics, and engineering. Lanczos clarifies the meanings of terms such as limit or uniform convergence; and discusses the Sturm–Liouville problems, the Fejér mean, the Gibbs phenomenon, Fourier versus Taylor series, Fourier integrals, the Fourier transform, and the Laplace transform. He goes into the historical development of the subject, but does not cover Lebesgue integration or function spaces.
- Numbers without End, Edinburgh: Oliver & Boyd. 1968.
- Judaism and Science. Leeds University Press. 1970. ISBN 978-0-853-16021-2. Lectures given in honor of Selig Brodetsky.
- Space Through the Ages: The Evolution of Geometrical Ideas from Pythagoras to Hilbert and Einstein. Academic Press. 1970. ISBN 9780124358508. Based on a series of lectures given to mathematicians, physicists, chemists, engineers, and philosophers at North Carolina State University in 1968, Lanczos overviews the history of geometry from the time of the ancient Greeks up until the early twentieth century. He elaborates upon Euclidean geometry, tensor analysis, and the abstract vector spaces of Hilbert and Banach, and briefly describes projective geometry. He does not, however, discuss topology.
- The Einstein Decade (1905-1915). London: Elek. 1974. ISBN 978-0-236-17632-8. In this book, Lanczos made use of his fluency in the German language as his grasp of to mathematics and physics discuss in detail the scientific publications of Albert Einstein during that time.
- Davis, William R., ed. (1998). Cornelius Lanczos: Collected Published Papers with Commentaries. North Carolina State University. ISBN 0-929493-01-X.

=== Articles ===
- Lanczos, Kornel (1924). "Über eine stationäre Kosmologie im Sinne der Einsteinschen Gravitationstheorie". Zeitschrift für Physik (in German). 21 (1). Springer Science and Business Media LLC: 73–110. Bibcode:1924ZPhy...21...73L. doi:10.1007/bf01328251. ISSN 1434-6001. S2CID 122902359. Translated reprint Lanczos, K. (Kornel) (1997). "On a Stationary Cosmology in the Sense of Einstein's Theory of Gravitation". General Relativity and Gravitation. 29 (3): 363–399. doi:10.1023/A:1010277120072.
- Lanczos, Kornel (October 1950). "An iteration method for the solution of the eigenvalue problem of linear differential and integral operators" (PDF). Journal of Research of the National Bureau of Standards. 45 (4). Los Angeles: 255. doi:10.6028/jres.045.026. Research Paper 2133. September 1949.

== See also ==
- The conjugate gradient method for solving systems of linear equations
- Hungarian diaspora
