= Square wave (waveform) =

Type of non-sinusoidal waveform

- Sine, square, triangle, and sawtooth waveforms

General information
- General definition: $x(t) = 4 \left\lfloor t \right\rfloor - 2 \left\lfloor 2 t \right\rfloor + 1, 2 t \notin \mathbb{Z}$
- Fields of application: Electronics, synthesizers

Domain, codomain and image
- Domain: $\mathbb{R} \setminus \left\{ \tfrac{n}{2} \right\}, n \in \mathbb{Z}$
- Codomain: $\left\{ -1,1 \right\}$

Basic features
- Parity: Odd
- Period: 1
- Antiderivative: Triangle wave
- Fourier series: $x(t) = \frac{4}{\pi} \sum_{k=1}^{\infty} \frac{1}{2 k - 1} \sin \left( 2 \pi \left(2 k - 1 \right) t \right)$

Square wave sound sample
5 seconds of square wave at 220 Hz

Sine wave sound sample
For comparison, five seconds of a 220 Hz sine wave.

A square wave is a non-sinusoidal periodic waveform in which the amplitude alternates at a steady frequency between fixed minimum and maximum values, with the same duration at minimum and maximum. In an ideal square wave, the transitions between minimum and maximum are instantaneous.

The square wave is a special case of a pulse wave which allows arbitrary durations at minimum and maximum amplitudes. The ratio of the high period to the total period of a pulse wave is called the duty cycle. A true square wave has a 50% duty cycle (equal high and low periods).

Square waves are often encountered in electronics and signal processing, particularly digital electronics and digital signal processing. Its stochastic counterpart is a two-state trajectory.

== Origin and uses ==
Square waves are universally encountered in digital switching circuits and are naturally generated by binary (two-level) logic devices. They are used as timing references or "clock signals", because their fast transitions are suitable for triggering synchronous logic circuits at precisely determined intervals. However, as the frequency-domain graph shows, square waves contain a wide range of harmonics; these can generate electromagnetic radiation or pulses of current that interfere with other nearby circuits, causing noise or errors. To avoid this problem in very sensitive circuits such as precision analog-to-digital converters, sine waves are used instead of square waves as timing references.

In musical terms, they are often described as sounding hollow, and are therefore used as the basis for wind instrument sounds created using subtractive synthesis. They also make up the "beeping" alerts used in many household, commercial, and industrial contexts. Additionally, the distortion effect used on electric guitars clips the outermost regions of the waveform, causing it to increasingly resemble a square wave as more distortion is applied.

Simple two-level Rademacher functions are square waves.

== Definitions ==
The square wave in mathematics has many definitions, which are equivalent except at the discontinuities:

It can be defined as simply the sign function of a sinusoid:
$$\begin{align}
x(t) &= \sgn\left(\sin \frac{2\pi t}{T}\right) = \sgn(\sin 2\pi ft) \\
v(t) &= \sgn\left(\cos \frac{2\pi t}{T}\right) = \sgn(\cos 2\pi ft),
\end{align}$$
which will be 1 when the sinusoid is positive, −1 when the sinusoid is negative, and 0 at the discontinuities. Here, T is the period of the square wave and f is its frequency, which are related by the equation f = 1/T.

A square wave can also be defined with respect to the Heaviside step function u(t) or the rectangular function Π(t):
$$\begin{align}
x(t) &= 2\left[\sum_{n=-\infty}^\infty \Pi\left(\frac{2(t - nT)}{T} - \frac{1}{2}\right)\right] - 1 \\
&= 2\sum_{n=-\infty}^\infty \left[u \left(\frac{t}{T} - n\right) - u \left(\frac{t}{T} - n - \frac{1}{2} \right) \right] - 1.
\end{align}$$

A square wave can also be generated using the floor function directly:
$$x(t) = 2\left(2\lfloor ft\rfloor - \lfloor 2 ft\rfloor \right) + 1$$
and indirectly:
$$x(t) = \left(-1\right)^{\lfloor 2ft \rfloor}.$$

Using the Fourier series (below) one can show that the floor function may be written in trigonometric form
$$\frac{2}{\pi}\arctan\left(\tan\left(\frac{\pi ft}{2}\right)\right)+\frac{2}{\pi}\arctan\left(\cot\left(\frac{\pi ft}{2}\right)\right)$$

== Fourier analysis ==
The six arrows represent the first six terms of the Fourier series of a square wave. The two circles at the bottom represent the exact square wave (blue) and its Fourier-series approximation (purple).

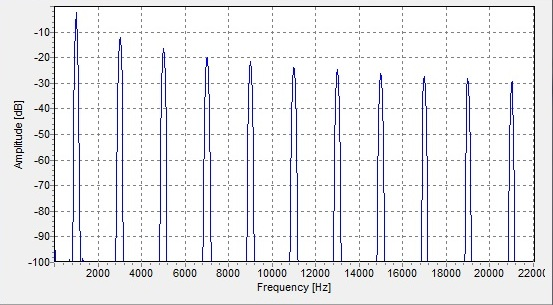
(Odd) harmonics of a 1000 Hz square wave

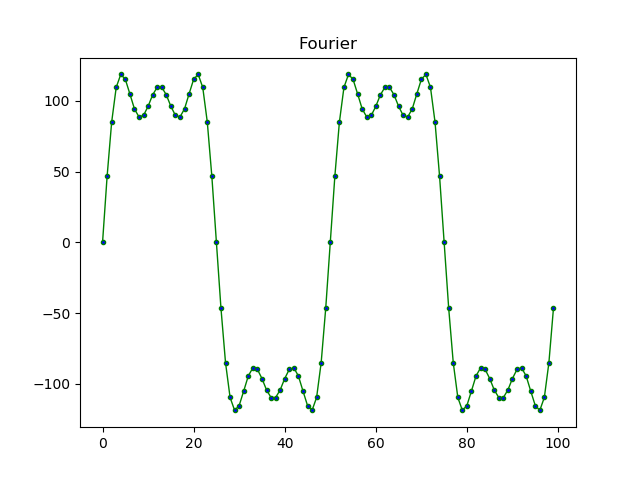
Graph showing the first 3 terms of the Fourier series of a square wave

Using Fourier expansion with cycle frequency f over time t, an ideal square wave with an amplitude of 1 can be represented as an infinite sum of sinusoidal waves:
$$\begin{align}
x(t) &= \frac{4}{\pi} \sum_{k=1}^\infty \frac{\sin\left(2\pi(2k - 1)ft\right)}{2k - 1} \\
&= \frac{4}{\pi} \left(\sin(\omega t) + \frac{1}{3} \sin(3 \omega t) + \frac{1}{5} \sin(5 \omega  t) + \ldots\right),
&\text{where }\omega=2\pi f.
\end{align}$$

Additive square demo
220 Hz square wave created by harmonics added every second over sine wave

The ideal square wave contains only components of odd-integer harmonic frequencies (of the form 2π(2k − 1)f).

A curiosity of the convergence of the Fourier series representation of the square wave is the Gibbs phenomenon. Ringing artifacts in non-ideal square waves can be shown to be related to this phenomenon. The Gibbs phenomenon can be prevented by the use of σ-approximation, which uses the Lanczos sigma factors to help the sequence converge more smoothly.

An ideal mathematical square wave changes between the high and the low state instantaneously, and without under- or over-shooting. This is impossible to achieve in physical systems, as it would require infinite bandwidth.

Animation of the additive synthesis of a square wave with an increasing number of harmonics

Square waves in physical systems have only finite bandwidth and often exhibit ringing effects similar to those of the Gibbs phenomenon or ripple effects similar to those of the σ-approximation.

For a reasonable approximation to the square-wave shape, at least the fundamental and third harmonic need to be present, with the fifth harmonic being desirable. These bandwidth requirements are important in digital electronics, where finite-bandwidth analog approximations to square-wave-like waveforms are used. (The ringing transients are an important electronic consideration here, as they may go beyond the electrical rating limits of a circuit or cause a badly positioned threshold to be crossed multiple times.)

== Characteristics of imperfect square waves ==
As already mentioned, an ideal square wave has instantaneous transitions between the high and low levels. In practice, this is never achieved because of physical limitations of the system that generates the waveform. The times taken for the signal to rise from the low level to the high level and back again are called the rise time and the fall time respectively.

If the system is overdamped, then the waveform may never actually reach the theoretical high and low levels, and if the system is underdamped, it will oscillate about the high and low levels before settling down. In these cases, the rise and fall times are measured between specified intermediate levels, such as 5% and 95%, or 10% and 90%. The bandwidth of a system is related to the transition times of the waveform; there are formulas allowing one to be determined approximately from the other.

== See also ==
- List of periodic functions
- Rectangular function
- Pulse wave
- Sine wave
- Triangle wave
- Sawtooth wave
- Waveform
- Sound
- Multivibrator
- Ronchi ruling, a square-wave stripe target used in imaging.
- Cross sea
- Clarinet, a musical instrument that produces odd overtones approximating a square wave.
