= Sinc numerical methods =

In numerical analysis and applied mathematics, sinc numerical methods are numerical techniques for finding approximate solutions of partial differential equations and integral equations based on the translates of sinc function and Cardinal function C(f,h) which is an expansion of f defined by

$$C(f,h)(x)=\sum_{k=-\infty}^\infty f(kh) \, \textrm{sinc} \left(\dfrac{x}{h}-k \right)$$

where the step size h>0 and where the sinc function is defined by

$$\textrm{sinc}(x)=\frac{\sin(\pi x)}{\pi x}$$

Sinc approximation methods excel for problems whose solutions may have singularities, or infinite domains, or boundary layers.

The truncated Sinc expansion of f is defined by the following series:

$$C_{M,N}(f,h)(x)  = \displaystyle \sum_{k=-M}^{N} f(kh) \, \textrm{sinc} \left(\dfrac{x}{h}-k \right)$$.

== Sinc numerical methods cover ==
- function approximation,
- approximation of derivatives,
- approximate definite and indefinite integration,
- approximate solution of initial and boundary value ordinary differential equation (ODE) problems,
- approximation and inversion of Fourier and Laplace transforms,
- approximation of Hilbert transforms,
- approximation of definite and indefinite convolution,
- approximate solution of partial differential equations,
- approximate solution of integral equations,
- construction of conformal maps.

In the standard setup of the sinc numerical methods, the errors (in big O notation) are known to be $O\left(e^{-c\sqrt{n}}\right)$ with some c>0, where n is the number of nodes or bases used in the methods. However, Sugihara has recently found that the errors in the Sinc numerical methods based on double exponential transformation are $O\left(e^{-\frac{k n}{\ln n}}\right)$ with some k>0, in a setup that is also meaningful both theoretically and practically and are found to be best possible in a certain mathematical sense.

== Reading ==
- Stenger, Frank (2011). Handbook of Sinc Numerical Methods. Boca Raton, Florida: CRC Press. ISBN 9781439821596.
- Lund, John; Bowers, Kenneth (1992). Sinc Methods for Quadrature and Differential Equations. Philadelphia: Society for Industrial and Applied Mathematics (SIAM). ISBN 9780898712988.
