= Boxcar function =

Mathematical function resembling a boxcar

A graphical representation of a boxcar function

In mathematics, a boxcar function is any function which is zero over the entire real line except for a single interval where it is equal to a constant $A$. The function is named after its graph's resemblance to a boxcar, a type of railroad car. The boxcar function can be expressed in terms of the uniform distribution as

$$\operatorname{boxcar}(x)= (b-a)A\,f(a,b;x) = A(H(x-a) - H(x-b)),$$

where $f(a,b;x)$ is the uniform distribution of $x$ for the interval $[a,b]$ and $H(x)$ is the Heaviside step function. As with most such discontinuous functions, there is a question of the value at the transition points, which are usually best chosen depending on the individual application.

When a boxcar function is selected as the impulse response of a filter, the result is a simple moving average filter, whose frequency response is a sinc-in-frequency, a type of low-pass filter.

== See also ==
- Boxcar averager
- Rectangular function
- Step function
- Top-hat filter
