= Henry Wilbraham =

English mathematician (1825–1883)

- Born: 25 July 1825
- Died: 13 February 1883 (aged 57)

Henry Wilbraham (25 July 1825 – 13 February 1883) was an English mathematician. He is known for discovering and explaining the Gibbs phenomenon nearly fifty years before J. Willard Gibbs did. Gibbs and Maxime Bôcher, as well as nearly everyone else, were unaware of Wilbraham's paper on the Gibbs phenomenon.

== Biography ==
Henry Wilbraham was born to George and Lady Anne Wilbraham at Delamere, Cheshire. His family was privileged, with his father a parliamentarian and his mother the daughter of the Earl Fortescue. He attended Harrow School before being admitted to Trinity College, Cambridge at the age of 16. He received a BA in 1846 and an MA in 1849 from Cambridge. At the age of 22 he published his paper on the Gibbs phenomenon. He remained at Trinity as a Fellow until 1856. In 1864 he married Mary Jane Marriott, and together they had seven children. In the last years of his life, he was the District Registrar of the Chancery Court at Manchester.
