= Whittaker–Shannon interpolation formula =

Signal (re‑)construction algorithm

The Whittaker–Shannon interpolation formula or sinc interpolation is a method to construct a continuous-time bandlimited function from a sequence of real numbers. The formula dates back to the works of E. Borel in 1898, and E. T. Whittaker in 1915, and was cited from works of J. M. Whittaker in 1935, and in the formulation of the Nyquist–Shannon sampling theorem by Claude Shannon in 1949. It is also commonly called Shannon's interpolation formula and Whittaker's interpolation formula. E. T. Whittaker, who published it in 1915, called it the Cardinal series.

== Definition ==
In the figure on the left, the gray curve shows a function f(t) in the time domain that is sampled (the black dots) at steadily increasing sample-rates and reconstructed to produce the gold curve. In the figure on the right, the red curve shows the frequency spectrum of the original function f(t), which does not change. The highest frequency in the spectrum is half the width of the entire spectrum. The steadily-increasing pink shading represents the reconstructed function's frequency spectrum, which gradually fills up more of the original function's frequency spectrum as the sampling-rate increases. When the reconstructed function's frequency spectrum encompasses the original function's entire frequency spectrum, it is twice as wide as the highest frequency, and that is when the reconstructed waveform matches the sampled one.

Given a sequence of real numbers, $x[n]=x(nT)$, representing a sequence of samples at time intervals of $T$ seconds, consider the following continuous function:

$$x(t) = \sum_{n=-\infty}^{\infty} x[n] \, {\rm sinc}\left(\frac{t - nT}{T}\right),$$

where $\rm sinc(t)$ denotes the normalized sinc function $\frac{\sin(\pi t)}{\pi t}$.

$x(t)$ has a Fourier transform $X(f)$, whose non-zero values are confined to the region $|f| \le \frac{1}{2T}$, and a bandlimit of $1/(2T)$ cycles/sec (hertz). The quantity $f_s = 1/T$ is known as the sample rate, and $f_s/2$ is the corresponding Nyquist frequency. When the sampled function has a bandlimit less than the Nyquist frequency, $x(t)$ is a perfect reconstruction of the original function (see sampling theorem). Otherwise, the frequency components above the Nyquist frequency will "fold" into the sub-Nyquist region of $X(f)$, resulting in distortion.

== Equivalent formulation: convolution/lowpass filter ==
The interpolation formula is derived in the Nyquist–Shannon sampling theorem article, which points out that it can also be expressed as the convolution of an infinite impulse train with a sinc function:

$$x(t) = \left( \sum_{n=-\infty}^{\infty} T\cdot \underbrace{x(nT)}_{x[n]}\cdot \delta \left( t - nT \right) \right) *
\left( \frac{1}{T}{\rm sinc}\left(\frac{t}{T}\right) \right),$$

where the convolution of two functions $f$ and $g$ is the following integral transform, denoted using "*":

$$(f * g)(t) := \int_{-\infty}^\infty f(\tau) g(t - \tau) \, d\tau.$$

This interpolation formula is equivalent to filtering the impulse train with an ideal (brick-wall) low-pass filter with gain of 1 (or 0 dB) in the passband. If the sample rate is sufficiently high, this means that the baseband image (the original signal before sampling) is passed unchanged and the other images are removed by the brick-wall filter.

== Convergence ==
The interpolation formula always converges absolutely and locally uniformly as long as

$$\sum_{n\in\Z,\,n\ne 0}\left|\frac{x[n]}n\right|<\infty.$$

By the Hölder inequality this is satisfied if the sequence $(x[n])_{n\in\Z}$ belongs to any of the $\ell^p(\Z,\mathbb C)$ spaces with 1 ≤ p < ∞, that is

$$\sum_{n\in\Z}\left|x[n]\right|^p<\infty.$$

This condition is sufficient, but not necessary. For example, the sum will generally converge if the sample sequence comes from sampling almost any stationary process, in which case the sample sequence is not square summable, and is not in any $\ell^p(\Z,\mathbb C)$ space.

== Stationary random processes ==
If x[n] is an infinite sequence of samples of a sample function of a wide-sense stationary process, then it is not a member of any $\ell^p$ or L^{p} space, with probability 1; that is, the infinite sum of samples raised to a power p does not have a finite expected value. Nevertheless, the interpolation formula converges with probability 1. Convergence can readily be shown by computing the variances of truncated terms of the summation, and showing that the variance can be made arbitrarily small by choosing a sufficient number of terms. If the process mean is nonzero, then pairs of terms need to be considered to also show that the expected value of the truncated terms converges to zero.

Since a random process does not have a Fourier transform, the condition under which the sum converges to the original function must also be different. A stationary random process does have an autocorrelation function and hence a spectral density according to the Wiener–Khinchin theorem. A suitable condition for convergence to a sample function from the process is that the spectral density of the process be zero at all frequencies equal to and above half the sample rate.

== See also ==
- Aliasing, Anti-aliasing filter, Spatial anti-aliasing
- Rectangular function
- Sampling (signal processing)
- Signal (electronics)
- Sinc function, Sinc filter
- Lanczos resampling
