= Edge enhancement =

Image processing filter

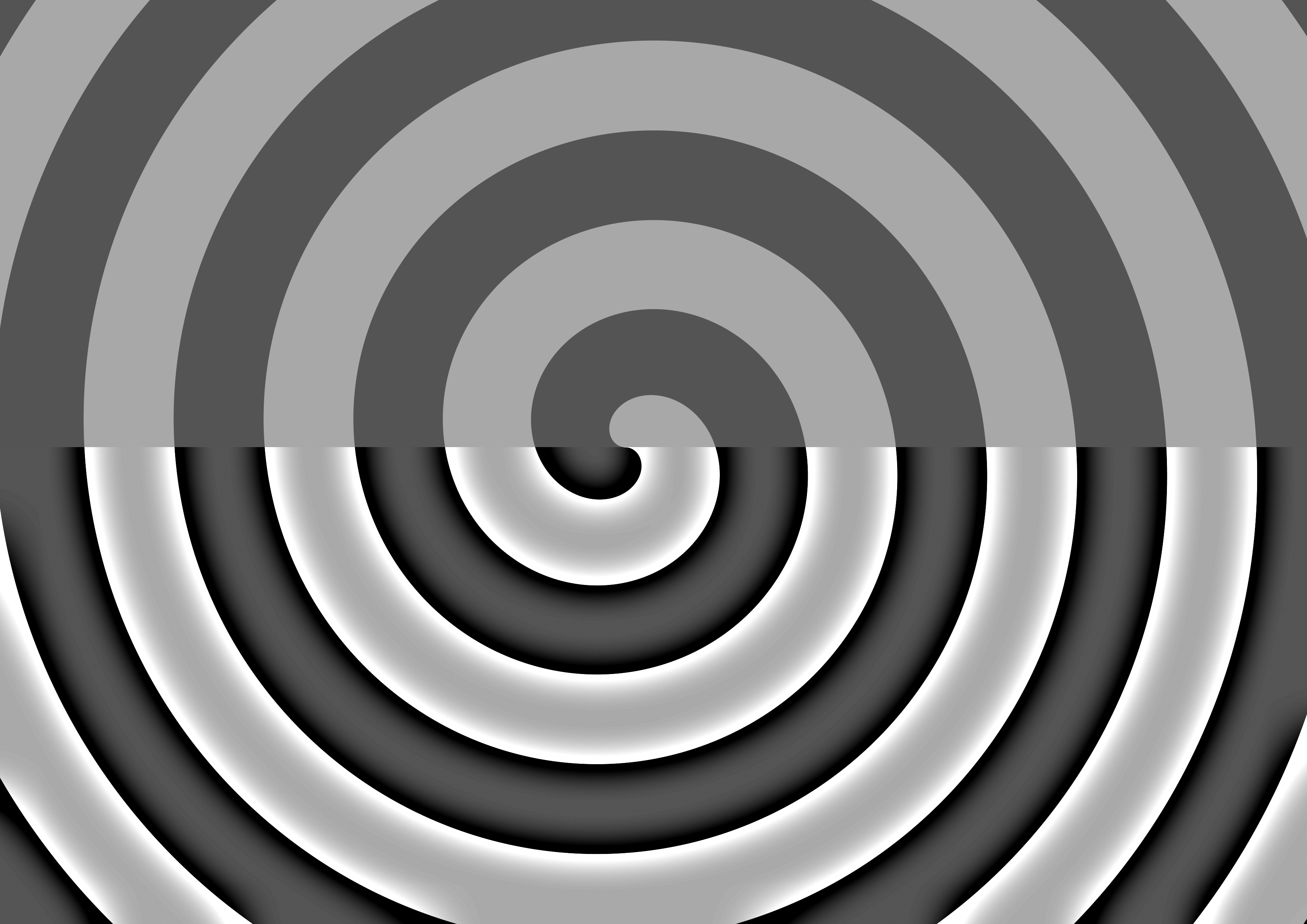
Unsharp masking has been applied to lower part of image, creating overshoot and undershoot and increasing acutance.

Edge enhancement is an image processing filter that enhances the edge contrast of an image or video in an attempt to improve its acutance (apparent sharpness).

The filter works by identifying sharp edge boundaries in the image, such as the edge between a subject and a background of a contrasting color, and increasing the image contrast in the area immediately around the edge. This has the effect of creating subtle bright and dark highlights on either side of any edges in the image, called overshoot and undershoot, leading the edge to look more defined when viewed from a typical viewing distance.

The process is prevalent in the video field, appearing to some degree in the majority of TV broadcasts and DVDs. A modern television set's "sharpness" control is an example of edge enhancement. It is also widely used in computer printers especially for font or/and graphics to get a better printing quality. Most digital cameras also perform some edge enhancement, which in some cases cannot be adjusted.

Edge enhancement can be either an analog or a digital process. Analog edge enhancement may be used, for example, in all-analog video equipment such as modern CRT televisions.

== Properties ==
Edge enhancement applied to an image can vary according to a number of properties; the most common algorithm is unsharp masking, which has the following parameters:

- Amount. This controls the extent to which contrast in the edge detected area is enhanced.
- Radius or aperture. This affects the size of the edges to be detected or enhanced, and the size of the area surrounding the edge that will be altered by the enhancement. A smaller radius will result in enhancement being applied only to sharper, finer edges, and the enhancement being confined to a smaller area around the edge.
- Threshold. Where available, this adjusts the sensitivity of the edge detection mechanism. A lower threshold results in more subtle boundaries of colour being identified as edges. A threshold that is too low may result in some small parts of surface textures, film grain or noise being incorrectly identified as being an edge.

In some cases, edge enhancement can be applied in the horizontal or vertical direction only, or to both directions in different amounts. This may be useful, for example, when applying edge enhancement to images that were originally sourced from analog video.

== Effects of edge enhancement ==
Unlike some forms of image sharpening, edge enhancement does not enhance subtle detail which may appear in more uniform areas of the image, such as texture or grain which appears in flat or smooth areas of the image. The benefit to this is that imperfections in the image reproduction, such as grain or noise, or imperfections in the subject, such as natural imperfections on a person's skin, are not made more obvious by the process. A drawback to this is that the image may begin to look less natural, because the apparent sharpness of the overall image has increased but the level of detail in flat, smooth areas has not.

As with other forms of image sharpening, edge enhancement is only capable of improving the perceived sharpness or acutance of an image. The enhancement is not completely reversible, and as such some detail in the image is lost as a result of filtering. Further sharpening operations on the resulting image compound the loss of detail, leading to artifacts such as ringing. An example of this can be seen when an image that has already had edge enhancement applied, such as the picture on a DVD video, has further edge enhancement applied by the DVD player it is played on, and possibly also by the television it is displayed on. Essentially, the first edge enhancement filter creates new edges on either side of the existing edges, which are then further enhanced.

== Viewing conditions ==
The ideal amount of edge enhancement that is required to produce a pleasant and sharp-looking image, without losing too much detail, varies according to several factors. An image that is to be viewed from a nearer distance, at a larger display size, on a medium that is inherently more "sharp" or by a person with excellent eyesight will typically demand a finer or lesser amount of edge enhancement than an image that is to be shown at a smaller display size, further viewing distance, on a medium that is inherently softer or by a person with poorer eyesight.

For this reason, home cinema enthusiasts who invest in larger, higher quality screens often complain about the amount of edge enhancement present in commercially produced DVD videos, claiming that such edge enhancement is optimized for playback on smaller, poorer quality television screens, but the loss of detail as a result of the edge enhancement is much more noticeable in their viewing conditions.

== See also ==
- Discrete Laplace operator
- Acutance
