= Acutance =

Perception of image sharpness that is unrelated to actual resolution

An image with artificially increased acutance

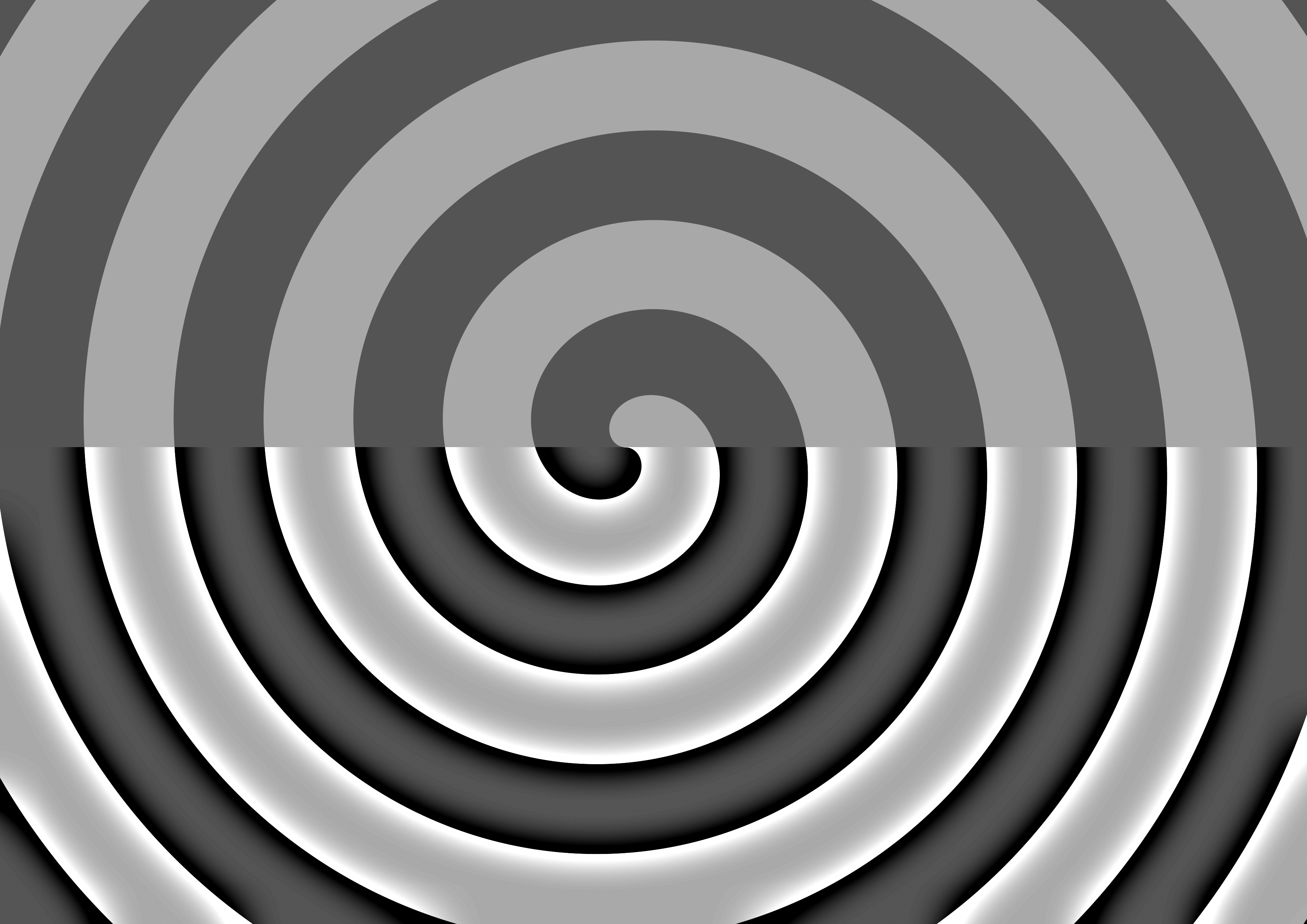
Another illustration, where overshoot caused by using unsharp masking to sharpen the image (bottom half) increases acutance.

In photography, acutance describes a subjective perception of visual acuity that is related to the edge contrast of an image. Acutance is related to the magnitude of the gradient of brightness. Due to the nature of the human visual system, an image with higher acutance appears sharper even though an increase in acutance does not increase real resolution.

Historically, acutance was enhanced chemically during development of a negative (high acutance developers), or by optical means in printing (unsharp masking). In digital photography, onboard camera software and image postprocessing tools such as Photoshop or GIMP offer various sharpening facilities, the most widely used of which is known as "unsharp mask" because the algorithm is derived from the eponymous analog processing method.

In the example image, two light gray lines were drawn on a gray background. As the transition is instantaneous, the line is as sharp as can be represented at this resolution. Acutance in the left line was artificially increased by adding a one-pixel-wide darker border on the outside of the line and a one-pixel-wide brighter border on the inside of the line. The actual sharpness of the image is unchanged, but the apparent sharpness is increased because of the greater acutance.

Artificially increased acutance has drawbacks. In this somewhat overdone example most viewers will also be able to see the borders separately from the line, which create two halos around the line, one dark and one shimmering bright.

== Tools ==
Several image processing techniques, such as unsharp masking, can increase the acutance in real images.

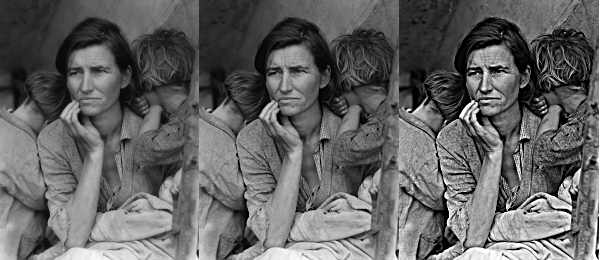
Unprocessed, slight unsharp masking, then strong unsharp masking.

=== Resampling ===
Low-pass filtering and resampling affect acutance.

Low-pass filtering and resampling often cause overshoot, which increases acutance, but can also reduce absolute gradient, which reduces acutance. Filtering and resampling can also cause clipping and ringing artifacts. An example is bicubic interpolation, widely used in image processing for resizing images.

== Definition ==
One definition of acutance is determined by imaging a sharp "knife-edge", producing an S-shaped distribution over a width W between maximum density D_{1} and minimum density D_{2} – steeper transitions yield higher acutance.

Averaging the squares of the slope G_{n} = ΔD/Δx of the curve at N points within W, and dividing by the density difference, gives the acutance value A:

$$A = \frac{1}{D_1 - D_2} \cdot \frac{1}{N}\sum_{n=1}^{N} G_n^2$$

The end points of W are critical: including too much of the edge trace makes the calculated acutance too low, and including too little makes it too high. They are usually placed where the slope falls to 0.005 density units per micrometre.

More generally, the acutance at a point in an image is related to the image gradient, the gradient of the density (or intensity) at that point, a vector quantity:

$$A = \nabla D$$

Several edge detection algorithms exist, based on the gradient norm or its components.

== Sharpness ==
Perceived sharpness is a combination of both resolution and acutance: it is thus a combination of the captured resolution, which cannot be changed in processing, and of acutance, which can be so changed.

Properly, perceived sharpness is the steepness of transitions (slope), which is change in output value divided by change in position – hence it is maximized for large changes in output value (as in sharpening filters) and small changes in position (high resolution).

Coarse grain or noise can, like sharpening filters, increase acutance, hence increasing the perception of sharpness, even though they degrade the signal-to-noise ratio.

The term critical sharpness is sometimes heard (by analogy with critical focus) for "obtaining maximal optical resolution", as limited by the sensor/film and lens, and in practice means minimizing camera shake – using a tripod or alternative support, mirror lock-up, a cable release or timer, image stabilizing lenses – and optimal aperture for the lens and scene, usually 2–3 stops down from wide-open (more for deeper scenes: balances off diffraction blur with defocus blur or lens limits at wide-open).

== See also ==
- Contrast (vision)
- Cornsweet illusion
- Edge enhancement
- Hyperacuity
- Mach bands
- Ringing artifact
