= Sigma approximation =

Animation of the additive synthesis of a square wave with an increasing number of harmonics by way of the σ-approximation with p=1

In mathematics, σ-approximation adjusts a Fourier summation to greatly reduce the Gibbs phenomenon, which would otherwise occur at discontinuities.

An m-1-term, σ-approximated summation for a series of period T can be written as follows:
$$s(\theta) = \frac{1}{2} a_0 + \sum_{k=1}^{m-1} \left(\operatorname{sinc} \frac{k}{m}\right)^{p} \cdot \left[a_{k} \cos \left( \frac{2 \pi k}{T} \theta \right) + b_k \sin \left( \frac{2 \pi k}{T} \theta \right) \right],$$
in terms of the normalized sinc function:
$$\operatorname{sinc} x = \frac{\sin \pi x}{\pi x}.$$
$a_{k}$ and $b_{k}$ are the typical Fourier Series coefficients, and p, a non negative parameter, determines the amount of smoothening applied, where higher values of p further reduce the Gibbs phenomenon but can overly smoothen the representation of the function.

The term
$$\left(\operatorname{sinc} \frac{k}{m}\right)^{p}$$
is the Lanczos σ factor, which is responsible for eliminating most of the Gibbs phenomenon. This is sampling the right side of the main lobe of the $\operatorname{sinc}$ function to rolloff the higher frequency Fourier Series coefficients.

As is known by the uncertainty principle, having a sharp cutoff in the frequency domain (cutting off the Fourier series abruptly without adjusting coefficients) causes a wide spread of information in the time domain (equivalent to large amounts of ringing).

This can also be understood as applying a window function to the Fourier series coefficients to balance maintaining a fast rise time (analogous to a narrow transition band) and small amounts of ringing (analogous to stopband attenuation).

== See also ==
- Lanczos resampling
