= Bandlimiting =

Limiting a signal to contain only low-frequency components

Bandlimiting is the process of reducing a signal’s energy outside a specific frequency range, keeping only the desired part of the signal’s spectrum. This technique is crucial in signal processing and communications to ensure signals stay clear and effective. For example, it helps prevent interference between radio frequency signals, like those used in radio or TV broadcasts, and reduces aliasing distortion (a type of error) when converting signals to digital form for digital signal processing.

Spectrum of a bandlimited baseband signal as a function of frequency

== Bandlimited signals ==
A bandlimited signal is a signal that, in strict terms, has no energy outside a specific frequency range. In practical use, a signal is called bandlimited if the energy beyond this range is so small that it can be ignored for a particular purpose, like audio recording or radio transmission. These signals can be either random (unpredictable, also called stochastic) or non-random (predictable, known as deterministic).

In mathematical terms, a bandlimited signal relates to its Fourier series or Fourier transform representation. A generic signal needs an infinite range of frequencies in a continuous Fourier series to describe it fully, but if only a finite range is enough, the signal is considered bandlimited. This means its Fourier transform or spectral density—which show the signal’s frequency content—has “bounded support”, meaning it drops to zero outside a limited frequency range.

A bandlimited signal theoretically must extend in time from minus infinity to plus infinity with at least occasional non-zero patches, which is not the case in practical situations (see lower down).

== Sampling bandlimited signals ==
A bandlimited signal can be perfectly recreated from its samples if the sampling rate—how often the signal is measured—is more than twice the signal's bandwidth (the range of frequencies it contains). This minimum rate is called the Nyquist rate, a key idea in the Nyquist–Shannon sampling theorem, which ensures no information is lost during sampling.

In reality, most signals aren't perfectly bandlimited, and signals we care about—like audio or radio waves—often have unwanted energy outside the desired frequency range. To handle this, digital signal processing tools that sample or change sample rates use bandlimiting filters to reduce aliasing (a distortion where high frequencies disguise themselves as lower ones). These filters must be designed carefully, as they alter the signal's frequency domain magnitude and phase (its strength and timing across frequencies) and its time domain properties (how it changes over time).

=== Example ===
An example of a simple deterministic bandlimited signal is a sinusoid of the form $x(t) = \sin(2 \pi ft + \theta).$ If this signal is sampled at a rate $f_s =\tfrac{1}{T} > 2f$ so that we have the samples $x(nT),$ for all integers $n$, we can recover $x(t)$ completely from these samples. Similarly, sums of sinusoids with different frequencies and phases are also bandlimited to the highest of their frequencies.

The signal whose Fourier transform is shown in the figure is also bandlimited. Suppose $x(t)$ is a signal whose Fourier transform is $X(f),$ the magnitude of which is shown in the figure. The highest frequency component in $x(t)$ is $B.$ As a result, the Nyquist rate is

$$R_N = 2B \,$$

or twice the highest frequency component in the signal, as shown in the figure. According to the sampling theorem, it is possible to reconstruct $x(t)\$ completely and exactly using the samples

$x(nT) = x \left( { n \over f_s } \right)$ for all integers $n \,$ and $T \ \stackrel{\mathrm{def}}{=}\ { 1 \over f_s }$

as long as

$$f_s > R_N  \,$$

The reconstruction of a signal from its samples can be accomplished using the Whittaker–Shannon interpolation formula.

== Bandlimited versus timelimited ==
A bandlimited signal cannot be also timelimited. More precisely, a function and its Fourier transform cannot both have finite support unless it is identically zero. This fact can be proved using complex analysis and properties of the Fourier transform.

=== Proof ===
Assume that a signal f(t) which has finite support in both domains and is not identically zero exists. Let's sample it faster than the Nyquist frequency, and compute respective Fourier transform $FT(f) = F_1(w)$ and discrete-time Fourier transform $DTFT(f) = F_2(w)$. According to properties of DTFT, $F_2(w) = \sum_{n=-\infty}^{+\infty} F_1(w+n f_x)$, where $f_x$ is the frequency used for discretization. If f is bandlimited, $F_1$ is zero outside of a certain interval, so with large enough $f_x$, $F_2$ will be zero in some intervals too, since individual supports of $F_1$ in sum of $F_2$ won't overlap. According to DTFT definition, $F_2$ is a sum of trigonometric functions, and since f(t) is time-limited, this sum will be finite, so $F_2$ will be actually a trigonometric polynomial. All trigonometric polynomials are holomorphic on a whole complex plane, and there is a simple theorem in complex analysis that says that all zeros of non-constant holomorphic function are isolated. But this contradicts our earlier finding that $F_2$ has intervals full of zeros, because points in such intervals are not isolated. Thus the only time- and bandwidth-limited signal is a constant zero.

One important consequence of this result is that it is impossible to generate a truly bandlimited signal in any real-world situation, because a bandlimited signal would require infinite time to transmit. All real-world signals are, by necessity, timelimited, which means that they cannot be bandlimited. Nevertheless, the concept of a bandlimited signal is a useful idealization for theoretical and analytical purposes. Furthermore, it is possible to approximate a bandlimited signal to any arbitrary level of accuracy desired.

A similar relationship between duration in time and bandwidth in frequency also forms the mathematical basis for the uncertainty principle in quantum mechanics. In that setting, the "width" of the time domain and frequency domain functions are evaluated with a variance-like measure. Quantitatively, the uncertainty principle imposes the following condition on any real waveform:

$$W_B T_D \ge 1$$

where

$W_B$ is a (suitably chosen) measure of bandwidth (in hertz), and

$T_D$ is a (suitably chosen) measure of time duration (in seconds).

In time–frequency analysis, these limits are known as the Gabor limit, and are interpreted as a limit on the simultaneous time–frequency resolution one may achieve.

== See also ==
- Band-pass filter
- Band-stop filter
