= Nyquist criterion =

Nyquist criterion may refer to:

- Nyquist stability criterion, a graphical technique for determining the stability of a feedback control system
- Nyquist frequency, ½ of the sampling rate of a discrete signal processing system
- Nyquist rate, a rate used in signal processing
- Nyquist ISI criterion, a condition to avoid intersymbol interference
