= Robert J. Marks II =

American engineer and intelligent design advocate (born 1950)

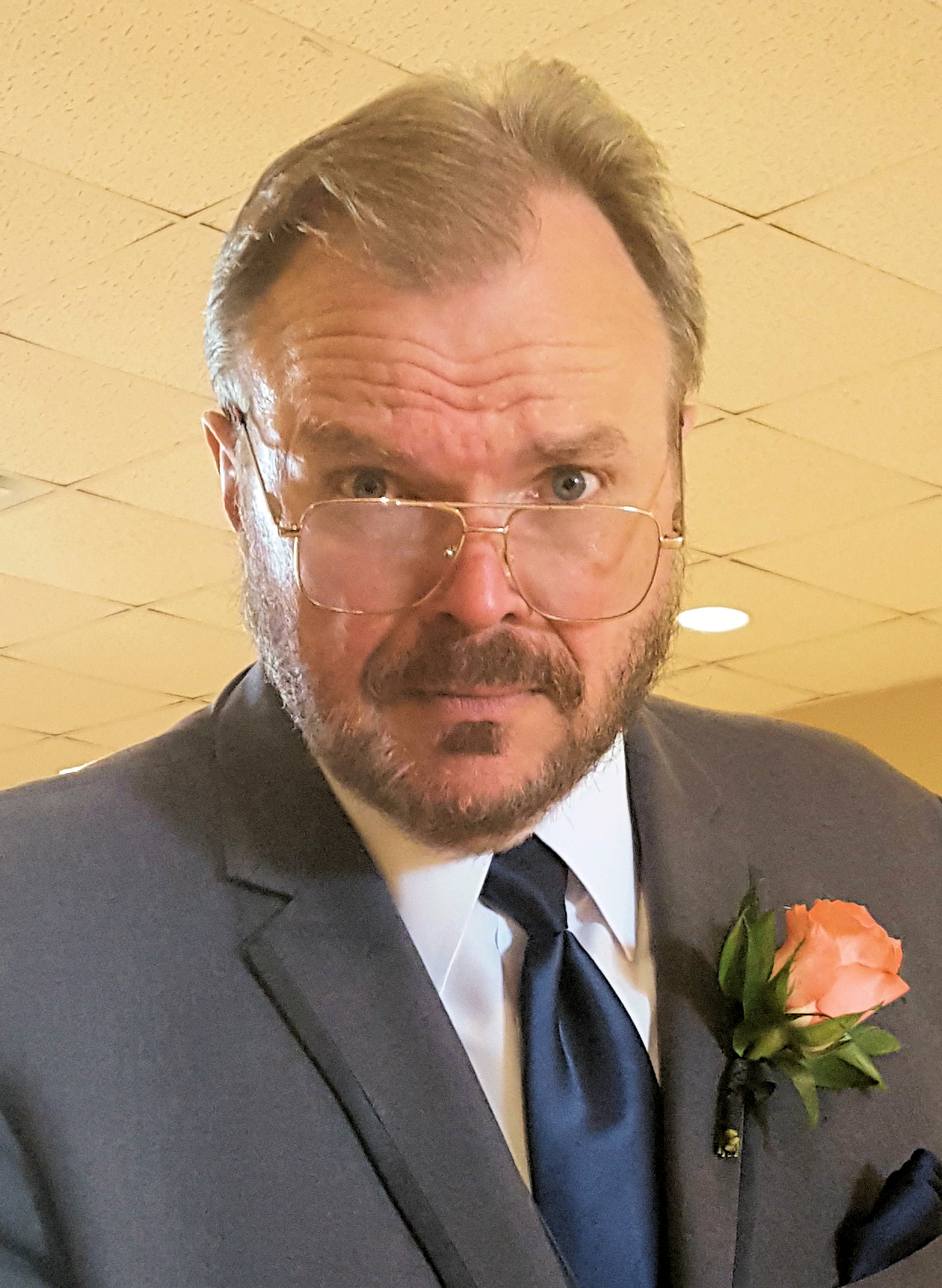
- Marks in 2016
- Born: August 25, 1950 (age 76); West Virginia, United States
- Education: Rose–Hulman Institute of Technology (BS, MS); Texas Tech University (PhD)
- Known for: Signal processing; Intelligent design; Evolutionary computation; Computational intelligence
- Scientific career
- Fields: Electrical engineering; Computer science
- Workplaces: Baylor University; University of Washington
- Thesis: Space-variant coherent optical processing (1977)
- Doctoral advisor: J.F. Walkup

Robert Jackson Marks II (born August 25, 1950) is an American electrical engineer, computer scientist and distinguished professor at Baylor University. His contributions include the Zhao-Atlas-Marks (ZAM) time-frequency distribution in the field of signal processing, the Cheung–Marks theorem in Shannon sampling theory and the Papoulis-Marks-Cheung (PMC) approach in multidimensional sampling. He was instrumental in the defining of the field of computational intelligence and co-edited the first book using computational intelligence in the title. A Christian and an old earth creationist, he is a subject of the 2008 pro-intelligent design motion picture, Expelled: No Intelligence Allowed.

== Professional career ==
Marks received his bachelor's and master's degrees from Rose–Hulman Institute of Technology in 1972 and 1973, respectively. During his doctoral studies at Texas Tech University, he was supervised by J.F. Walkup; his dissertation focused on optical signal processing. He obtained his Ph.D. degree in 1977.

Marks is a distinguished professor of electrical and computer engineering at Baylor University and serves as the director of the Walter Bradley Center for Natural and Artificial Intelligence. From 1977 to 2003, he was on the faculty of the University of Washington in Seattle. He was the first president of the Institute of Electrical and Electronics Engineers (IEEE) Neural Networks Council (now the IEEE Computational Intelligence Society). He is a Fellow of the IEEE and the Optical Society of America.

== Technical contributions ==
Marks is a researcher in the area of electrical engineering.

- Treatment of prostate cancer. Marks and his colleagues developed algorithms for real time identification of placement of radioactive seeds in cancerous prostates. For this work, he was a co-recipient of the Judith Stitt Best Abstract Award from the American Brachytherapy Society. The algorithm is used clinically.
- Optimal detection. In the field of detection theory, Marks and his colleagues developed the first closed form solution for the Neyman–Pearson optimal detection of signals in non-Gaussian noise

"Marks, Wise, Haldeman and Whited have derived exact expressions for the test statistic distribution functions, and thus were able to analyze the performance of the optimal detector for given values of signal strength and sample size."

- Power load forecasting using neural networks. With his colleagues at the University of Washington, Marks was the first to apply an artificial neural network to forecast power demands for utilities in 1991. Six years later neural networks were being used by 32 major North American utilities and remains in common use today. IEEE sponsors a MATLAB based webinar on use of neural networks in load forecasting. A technique "similar to one already used to successfully forecast electrical load needs" has been used to forecast Dow Jones closing values using data from millions of Twitter messages.
- The Smith Tube. Marks was a member of the Baylor research team that introduced the Smith Tube, a visualization tool useful in advanced microwave systems design. A generalization of the Smith Chart, the Smith Tube is currently in Keysight's Advanced Design System (ADS) software package.
- Convolutional neural networks. With Homma and Atlas, Marks developed a temporal convolutional neural network used widely in Deep learning.
- Signal display in time and frequency. The Zhao-Atlas-Marks time-frequency distribution, (a.k.a. the ZAM distribution or ZAMD), was originally called the cone shaped time-frequency distribution.
  - The ZAMD is a special case of Cohen's class of time-frequency distributions.
  - The ZAMD is currently in the MATLAB Time-Frequency Toolbox and National Instruments' LabVIEW Tools for Time-Frequency, Time-Series, and Wavelet Analysis
  - The ZAMD has been applied in numerous areas:
    "[The ZAMGTFR [ZAMD] has advantage over most of the other TFRs under conditions of low SNR and some characteristic features are easy to be extracted from the 2-D time-frequency plane."
    "The ZAM-TFD [ZAMD] has been shown to be effective in tracking frequency hopping signals and representing signals in the presence of white noise."
    "The Zhao–Atlas–Marks distribution produces a good resolution in time and frequency domains. The ZAMD method reduces the interference resulting from the cross-terms present in multi-component signals. It is useful in resolving close spectral peaks and capturing non-stationary and multi-component signals."
    "[T]he Zhao-Atlas-Marks time-frequency distribution ... significantly enhances the time and frequency resolution and eliminates all undesirable cross terms. // The ZAM distribution has been applied to speech with remarkable results."
- Remote sensing. Marks and his colleagues were the first to use neural network inversion in remote sensing. They measured snow parameters from microwave measurements made by satellites. Their general approach is widely used today.
- Wireless arrays. Marks is a co-recipient of a NASA Tech Brief for pioneering power efficient communication in wireless arrays.
- Power generation. Working with Southern California Edison, Marks and his colleagues pioneered computational intelligence based methods for early detection of intermittent shorted windings in multi ton electric generators while the rotors were still turning.
  "[Their diagnostic test performs] detection and localization of shorted turns in the DC field winding of turbine-generator rotors using novelty detection and fuzzified neural networks. Use of neural networks with fuzzy logic outputs and traveling wave techniques ... is an accurate locator of shorted turns in turbo-generator rotors."
- Marks has made contributions to the sampling theorem including authoring the first book exclusively dedicated to the subject.
  - Restoration of lost samples. Using "sophisticated estimation of the missing samples using previous and future samples", Marks first showed that, when a signal is sampled above its Nyquist rate, lost samples "are redundant, in the sense that any finite number of them can be obtained from the remaining ones by solving a system of linear equations".
  - Ill-posed sampling (The Cheung-Marks Theorem). The sampling theorem's Cheung–Marks theorem shows that samples taken from a signal at or above the Nyquist rate may prove incapable of restoring the signal in the presence of small amounts of noise.
  - Optimal image sampling. An image is said to be optimally sampled when the samples per unit area are minimized subject to no degradation of the interpolated image. Marks's contributions to optimal image sampling include:
  - The Papoulis-Marks-Cheung Approach. Marks and Cheung extended the generalized sampling expansion of Athanasios Papoulis to higher dimensions.
    "Marks and Cheung focused on images with a given spectral support region and an initial base sampling lattice such that the induced spectral replicas of this support region do not overlap. They then showed that cosets of some sublattice could be removed from the base lattice until the sampling density was minimal (in the Landau sense) or approached minimal ... [This] allows the sampling rate to be reduced until it equals or approaches the Landau minimum."
  - Sub-Nyquist Sampling. Cheung and Marks showed that images could be sampled below their Nyquist rate and still be recovered without aliasing.
    "[Their] very interesting multidimensional construction ... exploit[s] the [required] spectral gaps that occur when sampling multidimensional signals. Their approach is to slice the spectrum into narrow bands, and handle separately those bands which contain signal energy and those which do not."
- Optical computers. Marks invented and implemented an all optical computer that – using lenses, mirrors, and light from a laser – performs iterative calculations literally at the speed of light.
  "While many problems in optics can be solved by projections, it is difficult to solve such problems using all-optical methods. A notable exception is Marks' all-optical implementations of the convex projection algorithm for implementing super-resolution."

== Evolutionary Informatics Lab website ==
In 2006 Marks hired William Dembski as a part-time postdoctoral researcher; Dembski is an intelligent design proponent and former Baylor staff member at the heart of a previous intelligent design controversy at Baylor over the Michael Polanyi Center's promotion of intelligent design, which had been resolved when Baylor disbanded that center in 2000. Dembski's position in Marks' lab was funded by a $30,000 gift from the Lifeworks Foundation; the gift went through the university's development department and not its academic grant administration. Dembski's role was stated in the gift documents. Marks said that he kept Dembksi's presence quiet. By December 2006 Dembski's university position had been brought to the university administration's attention, and the university returned the unspent funds and terminated Dembski's position.

Marks created a website to describe the work that he and Dembski were doing, which the website described as happening at the "Evolutionary Informatics Lab" at Baylor. In the summer of 2007 that website was called to the attention of the Baylor administration after Marks discussed that work on a podcast hosted by Casey Luskin of the Discovery Institute, and the university administration shut the website down. Marks challenged the removal. The site was reposted to a server outside of Baylor.

The dispute over the website was covered in the 2008 pro-intelligent design film Expelled: No Intelligence Allowed.

== Christianity ==
Marks served as the faculty adviser to the University of Washington's chapter of Campus Crusade for Christ for seventeen years. He has presented his talk "What Does Calculus Have to Do with Christianity?" in Poland, Japan, Canada, Russia, and the United States.

Marks has made science-oriented Christian apologetics presentations. Venues include Poland, Japan, Moscow, Canada, and Siberia.

== Other activities ==
- With William A. Dembski, Marks offered statistical arguments against James Cameron's claim to have found the burial site of Jesus as portrayed in Cameron's documentary The Lost Tomb of Jesus.
- Marks has served as a consultant with Microsoft, DARPA, the Pacific Gas and Electric Company, The Boeing Company, the John Fluke Manufacturing Company, and Southern California Edison.
- Marks was the cartoonist for the student newspaper while at Rose–Hulman Institute of Technology.,
- Marks hosted a political radio talk show in the early 1970s.
- Marks's Erdős number is three and his Bacon number is two. Therefore, his Erdős–Bacon number is five.

== Books by Robert J. Marks II ==
- R.J. Marks II, Non-Computable You: What You Do That Artificial Intelligence Never Will, Discovery Press, (2022).
- R.J. Marks II and William A. Dembski with J. P. Moreland, For a Greater Purpose: The Life and Legacy of Walter Bradley, Erasmus Press, (2020).
- R.J. Marks II, The Case for Killer Robots: Why America's Military Needs to Continue Development of Lethal AI, Discovery Institute Press, (2020).
- R.J. Marks II, William A. Dembski and Winston Ewert, Introduction to Evolutionary Informatics, World Scientific, Singapore, (2017).
- R.J. Marks II, Michael Behe, William A. Dembski, Bruce L. Gordon, John C. Sanford, Editors, Biological Information - New Perspectives, World Scientific, Singapore, (2013).
- R.J. Marks II, Handbook of Fourier Analysis and Its Applications, Oxford University Press, (2009).
- R. D. Reed and R.J. Marks II, Neural Smithing: Supervised Learning in Feedforward Artificial Neural Networks, MIT Press, Cambridge, MA, (1999).
- M. Palaniswami, Y. Attikiouzel, R.J. Marks II, David B. Fogel and Toshio Fukuda; Editors, Computational Intelligence: A Dynamic System Perspective, IEEE Press, (1995).
- R.J. Marks II, Editor, Fuzzy Logic Technology and Applications, IEEE Technical Activities Board, Piscataway, (1994).
- Jacek M. Zurada, R.J. Marks II and C.J. Robinson; Editors, Computational Intelligence: Imitating Life, (IEEE Press, 1994).
- R.J. Marks II, Editor, Advanced Topics in Shannon Sampling and Interpolation Theory, (Springer-Verlag, 1993).
- R.J. Marks II, Introduction to Shannon Sampling and Interpolation Theory, Springer-Verlag, (1991).
- M.A. El-Sharkawi and R. J. Marks II, Editors, Applications of Neural Networks to Power Systems, IEEE Press, Piscataway, (1991).
