= Vladimir Kotelnikov =

Soviet engineer (1908–2005)

- Владимир Котельников
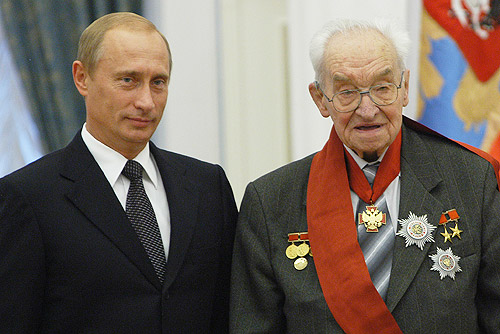
- Kotelnikov in 2003
- Born: Vladimir Aleksandrovich Kotelnikov; 6 September 1908; Kazan, Kazan Governorate, Russian Empire
- Died: 11 February 2005 (aged 96); Moscow, Russia
- Known for: Sampling theorem

Vladimir Aleksandrovich Kotelnikov (Russian: Владимир Александрович Котельников; 6 September 1908 – 11 February 2005) was an information theory and radar astronomy pioneer from the Soviet Union. He was elected a member of the Russian Academy of Sciences in the Department of Technical Science (radio technology) in 1953. From 30 July 1973 to 25 March 1980 Kotelnikov served as chairman of the Supreme Soviet of the RSFSR.

== Career timeline ==
- 1926–31 study of radio telecommunications at the Bauman Moscow State Technical University and Moscow Power Engineering Institute, dissertation in engineering science.
- 1931–41 worked at the MEI as an engineer, scientific assistant, laboratory director and lecturer.
- 1941–44 worked as a developer in the telecommunication industry.
- 1944–80 full professor at the MEI.
- 1953–87 deputy director and since 1954 director of the Institute of Radio-engineering and Electronics of the Russian Academy of Sciences (IRE RAS).
- 1970–88 vice-president of the RAS; since 1988 adviser of the presidium.

== Achievements ==
He is known mostly for having discovered, before e.g. Edmund Whittaker, Harry Nyquist, or Claude Shannon, the sampling theorem in 1933 (and hence, in Russian literature, it is known as the Kotelnikov's theorem). This result of Fourier analysis was known in harmonic analysis since the end of the 19th century and circulated in the 1920s and 1930s in the engineering community. He was the first to write down a precise statement of this theorem about signal transmission. He also was a pioneer in the use of signal theory in modulation and communications.

He is also a creator of the theory of optimum noise immunity. He obtained several scientific prizes for his work in radio astronomy and signal theory. In 1961, he oversaw one of the first efforts to probe the planet Venus with radar. In June 1962 he led the first probe of the planet Mercury with radar.

Kotelnikov was also involved in cryptography, proving the absolute security of the one-time pad; his results were delivered in 1941, the time of Nazi Germany's invasion of the Soviet Union, in a report that apparently remains classified. In this, as with the above-mentioned sampling theorem, he and Claude Shannon in the US reached the same conclusions independently of each other. For his achievements, Kotelnikov was awarded the IEEE 2000 Gold Medal of Alexander Graham Bell and the honorable IEEE Third Millennium Medal. Prof. Bruce Eisenstein, the President of the IEEE, described Kotelnikov as follows: "The outstanding hero of the present. His merits are recognized all over the world. In front of us is the giant of radio engineering thought, who has made the most significant contribution to media communication development".

== Honours and awards ==
- Order "For Merit to the Fatherland":
  - 1st class (21 September 2003) – for outstanding achievement in the development of science and many years of fruitful activity
  - 2nd class (6 July 1998) – for outstanding service to the state, his great personal contribution to the development of national science and training of highly qualified personnel
- Twice Hero of Socialist Labour (1969, 1978)
- Six Orders of Lenin
- Order of the Red Banner of Labour, twice
- Order of the Badge of Honour
- Lenin Prize (1964)
- Two Stalin Prizes (1943, 1946)
- Badge "For Services to Moscow" (26 August 2003)
- Prize of the Council of Ministers
- Lomonosov Gold Medal (1981)
- Popov Gold Medal (1974)
- Gold Medal of the Academy of Sciences of the USSR (1987)
- IEEE Award in honor of Hernand and Sosthenes Behn (1973)
- Main prize of the Eduard Rhein Foundation (1999)
- IEEE Alexander Graham Bell Medal (of the USA) (2000)
- The Koronian asteroid 2726 Kotelnikov was named in his honor in 1984.
- Kotel'nikov's name has also been given to a naval vessel and the Institute of Radio-engineering and Electronics.

Awards
Preceded by David Messerschmitt	IEEE Alexander Graham Bell Medal; 2000	Succeeded by Not awarded (Joachim Hagenauer, 2002)
