= 2726 Kotelnikov =

Stony Koronian asteroid from the outer regions of the asteroid belt

- [[Nikolai Chernykh|N. Cherny

Discovery
- Discovered by: N. Chernykh
- Discovery site: Crimean Astrophysical Obs.
- Discovery date: 22 September 1979

Designations
- Named after: Vladimir Kotelnikov (Soviet radar astronomer)
- Alternative designations: 1979 SE_{9} · 1952 BR_{1} 1955 UK_{1} · 1969 RC_{1} 1972 GJ_{1} · 1974 SH_{1} 1974 TN · A906 QE
- Minor planet category: main-belt · (outer); Koronis

Orbital characteristics
- Epoch 23 March 2018 (JD 2458200.5)
- Uncertainty parameter 0
- Observation arc: 63.24 yr (23,100 d)
- Aphelion: 3.0746 AU
- Perihelion: 2.6429 AU
- Semi-major axis: 2.8588 AU
- Eccentricity: 0.0755
- Orbital period (sidereal): 4.83 yr (1,765 d)
- Mean anomaly: 319.83°
- Mean motion: 0° 12^{m} 14.04^{s} / day
- Inclination: 1.5581°
- Longitude of ascending node: 355.71°
- Argument of perihelion: 47.597°

Physical characteristics
- Mean diameter: 9.85 km (calculated); 10.937±0.207 km
- Synodic rotation period: 4.752±0.0034 h 4.9075 h 4.9078±0.0002 h
- Geometric albedo: 0.213±0.029; 0.24 (assumed)
- Spectral type: L/S · S (SDSS-MFB) (Note: Search for Unusual Spectroscopic Candidates Among 40313 minor planets from the 3rd Release of the Sloan Digital Sky Survey Moving Object Catalog (publication). SDSS-MFB (Masi Foglia Binzel) taxonomy (catalog).)
- Absolute magnitude (H): 11.990±0.002 (R); 12.1; 12.17±0.30; 12.2

2726 Kotelnikov, provisional designation 1979 SE_{9}, is a stony Koronian asteroid from the outer regions of the asteroid belt, approximately 10 kilometers (6.2 miles) in diameter. It was discovered on 22 September 1979, by Soviet astronomer Nikolai Chernykh at the Crimean Astrophysical Observatory in Nauchnij on the Crimean peninsula. The S-type asteroid has a rotation period of 4.91 hours and is a suspected binary system. The asteroid was named for Soviet scientist and pioneer in radar astronomy, Vladimir Kotelnikov.

== Orbit and classification ==
Kotelnikov is a member of the Koronis family (605), a very large family of stony asteroids with nearly co-planar ecliptical orbits, named after 158 Koronis.

It orbits the Sun in the outer main-belt at a distance of 2.6–3.1 AU once every 4 years and 10 months (1,765 days; semi-major axis of 2.86 AU). Its orbit has an eccentricity of 0.08 and an inclination of 2° with respect to the ecliptic.

The asteroid was first observed as A906 QE at Heidelberg Observatory in August 1906. The body's observation arc begins with a precovery taken at Palomar Observatory in June 1954, or 25 years prior to its official discovery observation at Nauchnij.

== Physical characteristics ==
Kotelnikov has been characterized as both a common S- and uncommon L-type asteroid by Pan-STARRS' photometric survey, while in the SDSS-MFB (Masi Foglia Binzel) taxonomy, it is classified as a stony S-type asteroid.

=== Rotation period ===
In October 2013, a rotational lightcurve of Kotelnikov was obtained from photometric observations in the R-band by astronomers with the Palomar Transient Factory in California. Lightcurve analysis gave a rotation period of 4.752 hours with a brightness variation of 0.26 magnitude (U=2). In March 2015, Swiss and French astronomers René Roy, Raoul Behrend and José De Queiroz measured a period of 4.9078 hours and an amplitude of 0.21 magnitude (U=2). The astronomers noted that Kotelnikov is likely a binary asteroid, yet more observations are required. The Collaborative Asteroid Lightcurve Link does not mention the asteroid's suspected binary status and consolidates a period of 4.9075 hours with an amplitude of 0.21 to 0.26.

=== Diameter and albedo ===
According to the survey carried out by the NEOWISE mission of NASA's Wide-field Infrared Survey Explorer, Kotelnikov measures 10.937 kilometers in diameter and its surface has an albedo of 0.213, while the Collaborative Asteroid Lightcurve Link assumes an albedo of 0.24 and calculates a diameter of 9.85 kilometers based on an absolute magnitude of 12.2.

== Naming ==
This minor planet was named after Soviet scientist Vladimir Kotelnikov (1908–2005), who pioneered radar astronomy in the Soviet Union. He was a long-time director of the Institute of Radio-engineering and Electronics and vice-president of the former USSR Academy of Science. The official naming citation was published by the Minor Planet Center on 8 November 1984 (M.P.C. 9214).
