= Nyquist filter =

Electronic filter used in receivers

A Nyquist filter is an electronic filter used in TV receivers to equalize the video characteristics. The filter is named after the Swedish–US engineer Harry Nyquist (1889–1976).

== Vestigial Side Band (VSB) ==
In analogue TV broadcasting the visual radio frequency (RF) signal is produced by amplitude modulation (AM) i.e., the video signal (VF) modulates the amplitude of the carrier. In AM two symmetric sidebands appear, containing identical information. So the RF bandwidth is two times the VF bandwidth. For example, the RF bandwidth of a VF signal with a bandwidth of 4.2 MHz, is 8.4 MHz. (System M) In order to use the broadcast band more efficiently, one sideband can be suppressed. However, it is impossible to suppress one sideband completely without affecting the other. Furthermore, a very sharp edge filter characteristic causes intolerable delay problems. So as a compromise, a standard filter is used which reduces a considerable portion of one side band (lower side band in RF) without causing extensive delay problems. Such a filter is known as vestigial side band filter (VSB).

== Example of a VSB ==
In System B the VF bandwidth is 5 MHz. Without any suppression, the corresponding visual RF bandwidth must be 10 MHz. (Here, presence of aural signal is omitted for the sake of simplification.) But by using a VSB filter, the visual RF bandwidth is reduced to 6.25 MHz; 5 MHz in one sideband and 1.25 MHz in the other sideband. (The filter characteristic in the suppressed sideband is such that between 0 and 0.75 MHz there is no suppression.) By this method, 3.75 MHz is economised, which means that for the same band allocated for broadcasting, the number of TV services increases approximately one and half fold.

== Demodulation problems ==
When VSB filter is used in broadcasting, a problem arises during demodulation. While 0 - 0.75 MHz region has two side bands, the region beyond 1.25 MHz has only one side band. ( i.e., 0 - 0.75 MHz region is double sideband and the region beyond 1.25 MHz is single sideband ) Thus, the level of the demodulated signal in 0 - 0.75 MHz region is 6 dB higher than the level in the region beyond 1.25 MHz. Since high frequency components of the VF signal correspond to fine details and color subcarrier, the demodulation results in fading the detailed portions and color saturation of the picture with respect to less detailed portions of the picture.

== Nyquist filter ==
In order to equalise the low frequency and high frequency components of the VF signal, a filter named a Nyquist filter is used in receivers. This filter, which is used before demodulation, is actually a low-pass filter with 6 dB suppression at the intermediate frequency (IF) carrier. Thus, the level of double sideband portion of the VF signal is suppressed and the original band characteristic is reconstructed at the output of the demodulator.

== Tolerance masks of the Nyquist filter ==
The specifications below are given for sound trap off case. System B (G or H in UHF band) refers to broadcast system used in most countries. System M refers to broadcast system used in America.

=== System B ===
Frequency, MHz	Level, dB
-1.65	-34
-1.65 to -1.35	-42
-1.0	-21.4
-0.5	-16.4 to -12.1
0	-6.4 to 5.7
0.5	-2.5 to -1.4
1	-0.75 to 0.12
1.4	-0.44 to 0.44
1.5	0
1.6 to 5.0	-0.44 to 0.44
5.0 to 10.0	0.44

=== System M ===
Frequency, MHz	Level, dB
-1.65	-34
-1.65 to -1.35	-42
-1.0	-21.4
-0.5	-16.4 to -12.1
0	-6.4 to - 5.7
0.5	-2.5 to -1.4
1	-0.75 to 0.12
1.4	-0.44 to 0.44
1.5	0
1.6 to 5	-0.5 to 0.5

== See also ==
- Broadcast television systems
- Sideband
- TV transmitters
