= Root-raised-cosine filter =

Linear filter in the time domain

In signal processing, a root-raised-cosine filter (RRC), sometimes known as square-root-raised-cosine filter (SRRC), is frequently used as the transmit and receive pulse shaping filter in a digital communication system to perform matched filtering. This helps in constraining the occupied bandwidth of the waveform without introducing intersymbol interference (ISI). The combined response of two such filters is that of the raised-cosine filter. It obtains its name from the fact that its frequency response, $H_{rrc}(f)$, is the square root of the frequency response of the raised-cosine filter, $H_{rc}(f)$:

$$H_{rc}(f) = H_{rrc}(f)\cdot H_{rrc}(f)$$

or:

$$|H_{rrc}(f)| = \sqrt{|H_{rc}(f)|}$$

or:

$h_{rc}(t) = \left(h_{rrc} * h_{rrc}\right)(t)$

where $*$ is being used to refer to convolution

== Why it is required ==
To have minimum ISI (Intersymbol interference), the overall response of transmit filter, channel response and receive filter has to satisfy Nyquist ISI criterion. The raised-cosine filter is the most popular filter response satisfying this criterion. To get the Signal-to-noise ratio benefits of matched filtering, half of this filtering is done on the transmit side and half is done on the receive side. On the receive side, the channel response, if it can be accurately estimated, can also be taken into account so that the overall response is that of a raised-cosine filter.

== Mathematical description ==
The impulse response of a root-raised cosine filter multiplied by T_{s}, for three values of β: 1.0 (blue), 0.5 (red) and 0 (green).

The RRC filter is characterised by two values; β, the roll-off factor, and T_{s} the reciprocal of the symbol-rate.

The impulse response of such a filter can be given as:

$$h(t) = \begin{cases}
\dfrac{1}{T_s} \left( 1 + \beta(\dfrac{4}{\pi}-1) \right),
& t = 0 \\
\dfrac{\beta}{T_s \sqrt{2}}
\left[
\left(1+\dfrac{2}{\pi}\right)\sin\left(\dfrac{\pi}{4\beta}\right) +
\left(1-\dfrac{2}{\pi}\right)\cos\left(\dfrac{\pi}{4\beta}\right)
\right],
& t = \pm \dfrac{T_s}{4\beta} \\
\dfrac{1}{T_s} \dfrac{\sin\left[\pi \dfrac{t}{T_s}\left(1-\beta\right)\right] + 4\beta\dfrac{t}{T_s}\cos\left[\pi\dfrac{t}{T_s}\left(1+\beta\right)\right]}{\pi \dfrac{t}{T_s}\left[1-\left(4\beta\dfrac{t}{T_s} \right)^2 \right]},
& \mbox{otherwise}
\end{cases}$$,

though there are other forms as well.

Unlike the raised-cosine filter, the impulse response is not zero at the intervals of ±T_{s}. However, the combined transmit and receive filters form a raised-cosine filter which does have zero at the intervals of ±T_{s}. Only in the case of β=0 does the root raised-cosine have zeros at ±T_{s}.
