= Raised-cosine filter =

Pulse-shaping filter in digital modulation

The raised-cosine filter is a filter frequently used for pulse-shaping in digital modulation due to its ability to minimise intersymbol interference (ISI). Its name stems from the fact that the non-zero portion of the frequency spectrum of its simplest form ($\beta = 1$) is a cosine function, 'raised' up to sit above the $f$ (horizontal) axis.

== Mathematical description ==
Frequency response of raised-cosine filter with various roll-off factors

Impulse response of raised-cosine filter with various roll-off factors

The raised-cosine filter is an implementation of a low-pass Nyquist filter, i.e., one that has the property of vestigial symmetry. This means that its spectrum exhibits odd symmetry about $\frac{1}{2T}$, where $T$ is the symbol-period of the communications system.

Its frequency-domain description is a piecewise-defined function, given by:

$$H(f) = \begin{cases}
1,
& |f| \leq \frac{1 - \beta}{2T} \\
\frac{1}{2}\left[1 + \cos\left(\frac{\pi T}{\beta}\left[|f| - \frac{1 - \beta}{2T}\right]\right)\right],
& \frac{1 - \beta}{2T} < |f| \leq \frac{1 + \beta}{2T} \\
0,
& \text{otherwise}
\end{cases}$$

or in terms of havercosines:

$$H(f) = \begin{cases}
1,
& |f| \leq \frac{1 - \beta}{2T} \\
\operatorname{hvc}\left(\frac{\pi T}{\beta}\left[|f| - \frac{1 - \beta}{2T}\right]\right),
& \frac{1 - \beta}{2T} < |f| \leq \frac{1 + \beta}{2T} \\
0,
& \text{otherwise}
\end{cases}$$

for

$$0 \leq \beta \leq 1$$

and characterised by two values; $\beta$, the roll-off factor, and $T$, the reciprocal of the symbol-rate.

The impulse response of such a filter is given by:

$$h(t) = \begin{cases}
\frac{\pi}{4T} \operatorname{sinc}\left(\frac{1}{2\beta}\right),
& t = \pm\frac{T}{2\beta} \\
\frac{1}{T}\operatorname{sinc}\left(\frac{t}{T}\right)\frac{\cos\left(\frac{\pi\beta t}{T}\right)}{1 - \left(\frac{2\beta t}{T}\right)^2},
& \text{otherwise}
\end{cases}$$

in terms of the normalised sinc function. Here, this is the "communications sinc" $\sin(\pi x)/(\pi x )$ rather than the mathematical one.

=== Roll-off factor ===
The roll-off factor, $\beta$, is a measure of the excess bandwidth of the filter, i.e. the bandwidth occupied beyond the Nyquist bandwidth of $\frac{1}{2T}$. Some authors use $\alpha=\beta$.

If we denote the excess bandwidth as $\Delta f$, then:

$$\beta = \frac{\Delta f}{\left(\frac{1}{2T}\right)} = \frac{\Delta f}{R_S/2} = 2T\,\Delta f$$

where $R_S = \frac{1}{T}$ is the symbol-rate.

The graph shows the amplitude response as $\beta$ is varied between 0 and 1, and the corresponding effect on the impulse response. As can be seen, the time-domain ripple level increases as $\beta$ decreases. This shows that the excess bandwidth of the filter can be reduced, but only at the expense of an elongated impulse response.

==== β = 0 ====
As $\beta$ approaches 0, the roll-off zone becomes infinitesimally narrow, hence:

$$\lim_{\beta \rightarrow 0}H(f) = \operatorname{rect}(fT)$$

where $\operatorname{rect}(\cdot)$ is the rectangular function, so the impulse response approaches $h(t)=\frac{1}{T}\operatorname{sinc}\left(\frac{t}{T}\right)$. Hence, it converges to an ideal or brick-wall filter in this case.

==== β = 1 ====
When $\beta = 1$, the non-zero portion of the spectrum is a pure raised cosine, leading to the simplification:

$$H(f)|_{\beta=1} = \left \{ \begin{matrix}
\frac{1}{2}\left[1 + \cos\left(\pi fT\right)\right],
& |f| \leq \frac{1}{T} \\
0,
& \text{otherwise}
\end{matrix} \right.$$

or

$$H(f)|_{\beta=1} = \left \{ \begin{matrix}
\operatorname{hvc}\left(\pi fT\right),
& |f| \leq \frac{1}{T} \\
0,
& \text{otherwise}
\end{matrix} \right.$$

=== Bandwidth ===
The bandwidth of a raised cosine filter is most commonly defined as the width of the non-zero frequency-positive portion of its spectrum, i.e.:

$$BW = \frac{R_S}{2}(\beta+1),\quad(0<\beta<1)$$

As measured using a spectrum analyzer, the radio bandwidth B in Hz of the modulated signal is twice the baseband bandwidth BW (as explained in [1]), i.e.:

$$B = 2 BW = R_S (\beta+1),\quad(0<\beta<1)$$

=== Auto-correlation function ===
The auto-correlation function of raised cosine function is as follows:

$$R\left(\tau\right) = T \left[\operatorname{sinc}\left( \frac{\tau}{T} \right) \frac{\cos\left( \beta \frac{\pi \tau}{T} \right)}{1 - \left( \frac{2 \beta \tau}{T} \right)^2} - \frac{\beta}{4} \operatorname{sinc}\left(\beta \frac{\tau}{T} \right) \frac{\cos\left( \frac{\pi \tau}{T} \right)}{1 - \left( \frac{\beta \tau}{T} \right)^2} \right]$$

The auto-correlation result can be used to analyze various sampling offset results when analyzed with auto-correlation.

== Application ==
Consecutive raised-cosine impulses, demonstrating zero-ISI property

When used to filter a symbol stream, a Nyquist filter has the property of eliminating ISI, as its impulse response is zero at all $nT$ (where $n$ is an integer), except $n = 0$.

Therefore, if the transmitted waveform is correctly sampled at the receiver, the original symbol values can be recovered completely.

However, in many practical communications systems, a matched filter is used in the receiver, due to the effects of white noise. For zero ISI, it is the net response of the transmit and receive filters that must equal $H(f)$:

$$H_R(f)\cdot H_T(f) = H(f)$$

And therefore:

$$|H_R(f)| = |H_T(f)| = \sqrt{|H(f)|}$$

These filters are called root-raised-cosine filters.

Raised cosine is a commonly used apodization filter for fiber Bragg gratings.
