= Kinnosuke Ogura =

Japanese mathematician and historian of mathematics

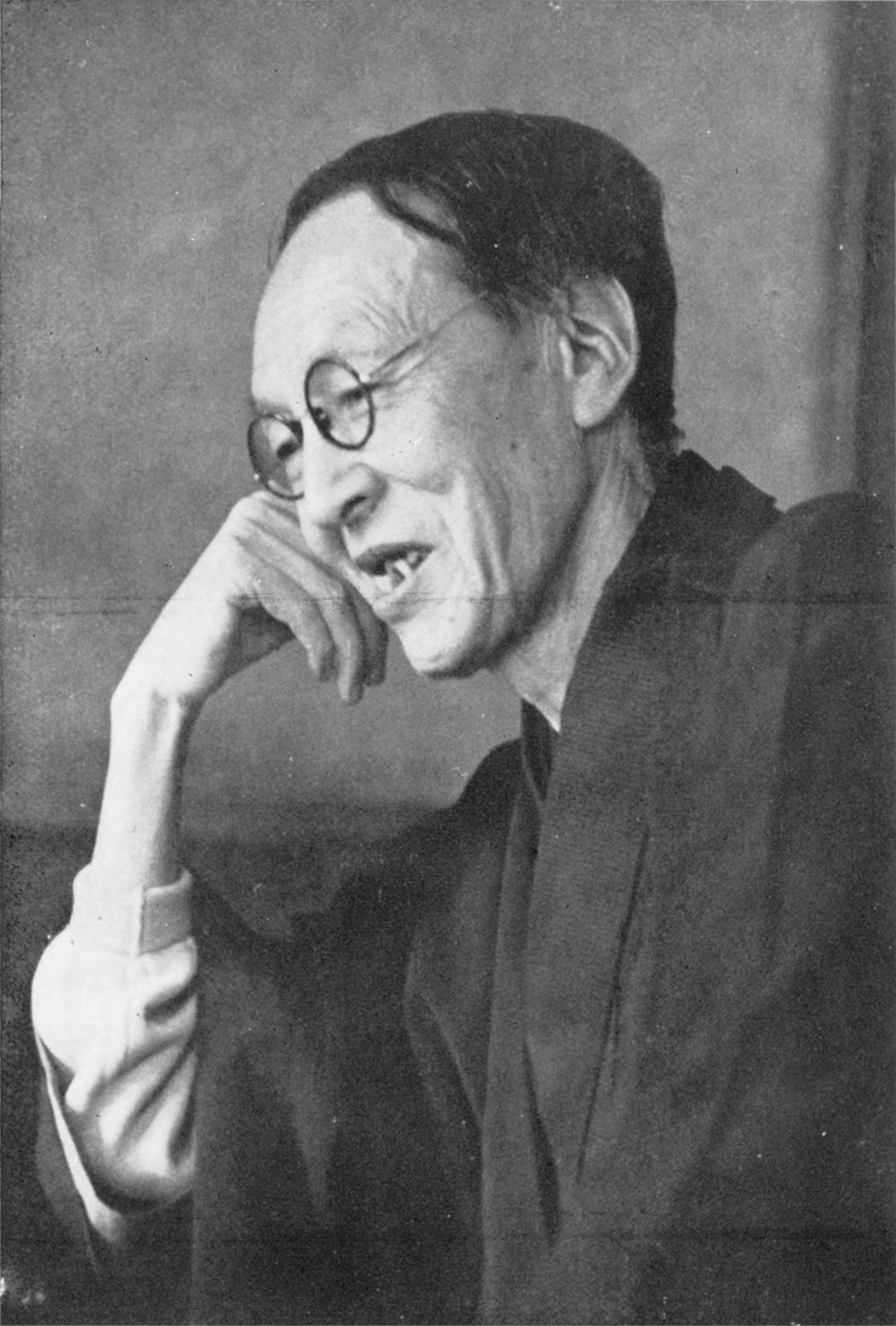
Image of Kinnosuke Ogura

Kinnosuke Ogura (born Sakata, Yamagata, 1885 – 1962, Japanese: 小倉金之助) was a Japanese mathematician and historian of mathematics.

He graduated in 1905 from Tokyo College of Science (now Tokyo Science University), and was a lecturer there from 1910 to 1911. He was assistant at the Department of Mathematics of the new Tohoku Imperial University from 1911 to 1917, and received his Ph.D. in 1916 with a thesis on trajectories in the conservative field of force. He did research in France for two years, from 1919 to 1922. He was an Invited Speaker of the ICM in 1920 at Strasbourg.

Ogura was a researcher from 1917 to 1937 at the Shiomi Institute of Physical and Chemical Research (antecedent of the Faculty of Science, Osaka Imperial University). He was appointed in 1940 as Chief Director of Tokyo College of Science. In 1946 he was elected President of the Association of Democratic Scientists of Japan.

Ogura died in 1962. His Collected Works appeared in eight volumes in 1974.
