= Institute of Radio-engineering and Electronics =

Research institute in Moscow, Russia

Institute of Radio-engineering and Electronics Институт радиотехники и электроники (ИРЭ)
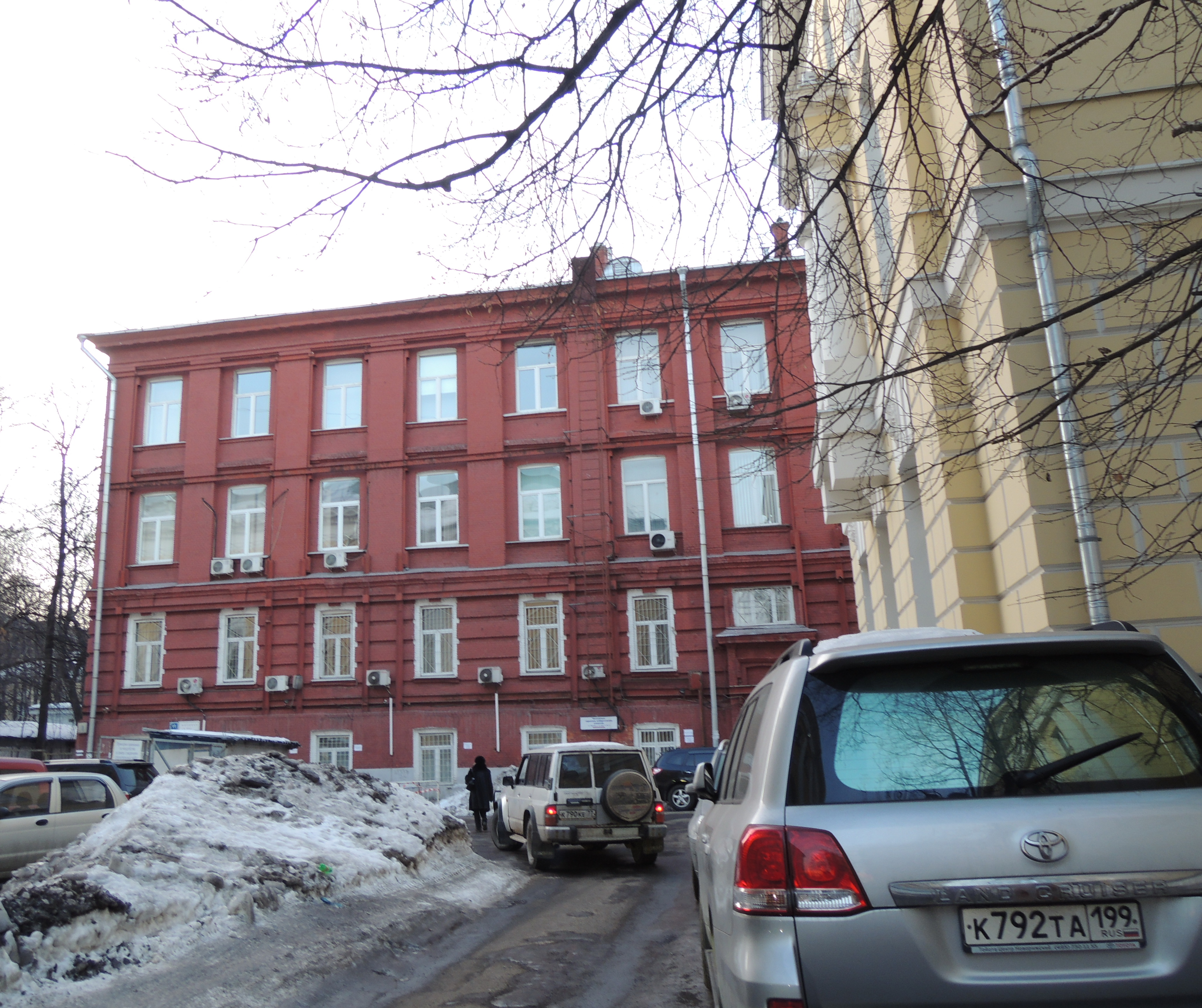
- Institute of Radio-engineering and Electronics
- Formation: 1953; 73 years ago
- Headquarters: Moscow, Russia
- Official languages: Russian
- Director General: Sergey Apollonovich Nikitov
- Website: www.cplire.ru

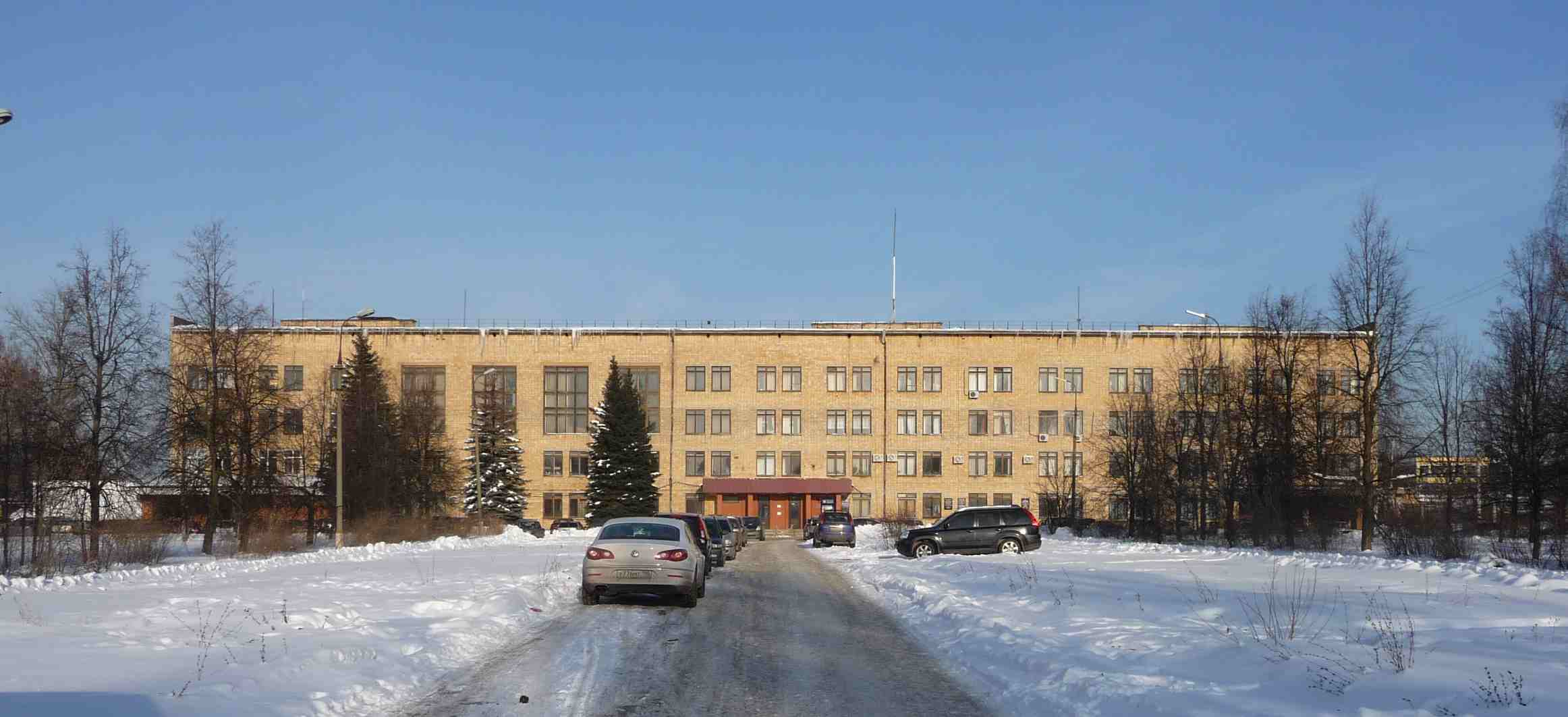
One of the building of the Fryazino branch of IRE RAS

Institute of Radio-engineering and Electronics (Russian: Институт радиотехники и электроники (ИРЭ)) by the Russian Academy of Science is an institute in Moscow, that conducts fundamental research in fields of radiophysics, radiotechnics, physical and quantum electronics, informatics. It was established in 1953 as an institute of the USSR Academy of Sciences, and expanded in 1955 to include sites in Fryazino, Saratov and Ulyanovsk. Since 1954, for a long time its director was the famous Soviet scientist Vladimir Kotelnikov. As of 2006 the director is Yuri Gulyaev.

In 1957 by a decision of the Central Committee of the CPSU and the Council of Ministers the institute was assigned a task of establishing stations, that would receive signals of Sputnik 1. There were very few professional stations in the USSR at the time, and the institute cooperated with radio amateurs throughout the country and provided necessary equipment to 30 selected large DOSAAF amateur radio clubs from the Baltic Sea to the Pacific Ocean.

The institute lead scientific works on the creation of the planetary radar and on the radiolocational exploration of other planets. One of the main results was creation of the first ever radar map of the Northern Hemisphere of Venus in 1984, using results of Venera 15 and Venera 16 missions.

In 1969 the institute was awarded the Order of the Red Banner of Labour.
