= Nyquist frequency =

Maximum frequency of non-aliased component upon sampling

Typical example of Nyquist frequency and rate. To avoid aliasing, the sampling rate must be no less than the Nyquist rate of the signal; that is, the Nyquist rate of the signal must be under double the Nyquist frequency of the sampling.

In signal processing, the Nyquist frequency (or folding frequency) is a characteristic of a sampler, which converts a continuous function or signal into a discrete sequence. It is named after Harry Nyquist. For a given sampling rate (samples per second), the Nyquist frequency (cycles per second) is the frequency whose cycle-length (or period) is twice the interval between samples, thus 0.5 cycles/sample. For example, audio CDs have a sampling rate of 44,100 samples/second. At 0.5 cycles/sample, the corresponding Nyquist frequency is 22,050 cycles/second (Hz). Conversely, the Nyquist rate for sampling a 22,050 Hz signal is 44,100 samples/second. (Note: When the function domain is distance, as in an image sampling system, the sample rate might be dots per inch and the corresponding Nyquist frequency would be in cycles per inch.)

When the highest frequency (bandwidth) of a signal is less than the Nyquist frequency of the sampler, the resulting discrete-time sequence is said to be free of the distortion known as aliasing, and the corresponding sample rate is said to be above the Nyquist rate for that particular signal.

In a typical application of sampling, one first chooses the highest frequency to be preserved and recreated, based on the expected content (voice, music, etc.) and desired fidelity. Then one inserts an anti-aliasing filter ahead of the sampler. Its job is to attenuate the frequencies above that limit. Finally, based on the characteristics of the filter, one chooses a sample rate (and corresponding Nyquist frequency) that will provide an acceptably small amount of aliasing. In applications where the sample rate is predetermined (such as the CD rate), the filter is chosen based on the Nyquist frequency, rather than vice versa.

== Folding frequency ==
The black dots are aliases of each other. The solid red line is an example of amplitude varying with frequency. The dashed red lines are the corresponding paths of the aliases.

In this example, f_{s} is the sampling rate, and 0.5 cycles/sample × f_{s} is the corresponding Nyquist frequency. The black dot plotted at 0.6 f_{s} represents the amplitude and frequency of a sinusoidal function whose frequency is 60% of the sample rate. The other three dots indicate the frequencies and amplitudes of three other sinusoids that would produce the same set of samples as the actual sinusoid that was sampled. Undersampling of the sinusoid at 0.6 f_{s} is what allows there to be a lower-frequency alias. If the true frequency were 0.4 f_{s}, there would still be aliases at 0.6, 1.4, 1.6, etc.

The red lines depict the paths (loci) of the four dots if we were to adjust the frequency and amplitude of the sinusoid along the solid red segment (between f_{s}/2 and f_{s}). No matter what function we choose to change the amplitude vs frequency, the graph will exhibit symmetry between 0 and f_{s}. This symmetry is commonly referred to as folding, and another name for f_{s}/2 (the Nyquist frequency) is the folding frequency.

== Other meanings ==
Early uses of the term Nyquist frequency, such as those cited above, are all consistent with the definition presented in this article. While some later publications, including some respectable textbooks, call twice the signal bandwidth the Nyquist frequency; this is a distinctly minority usage, and the frequency at twice the signal bandwidth is otherwise commonly referred to as the Nyquist rate.

== See also ==
- Nyquist–Shannon sampling theorem
