= Nyquist rate =

Minimum sampling rate to avoid aliasing

Fig 1: Typical example of Nyquist frequency and rate. They are rarely equal, because that would require over-sampling by a factor of 2 (i.e. 4 times the bandwidth).

In signal processing, the Nyquist rate is a value equal to twice the highest frequency (bandwidth) of a given function or signal. It is named after Harry Nyquist. It has units of samples per unit time, conventionally expressed as samples per second, or hertz (Hz). When the signal is sampled at a higher sample rate, the resulting discrete-time sequence is said to be free of the distortion known as aliasing. Conversely, for a given sample rate the corresponding Nyquist frequency is one-half the sample rate. Note that the Nyquist rate is a property of a continuous-time signal, whereas Nyquist frequency is a property of a discrete-time system.

The term Nyquist rate is also used in a different context with units of symbols per second, which is actually the field in which Harry Nyquist was working. In that context it is an upper bound for the symbol rate across a bandwidth-limited baseband channel such as a telegraph line or passband channel such as a limited radio frequency band or a frequency division multiplex channel.

== Relative to sampling ==
Fig 2: Fourier transform of a bandlimited function (amplitude vs frequency)

When a continuous function, $x(t),$ is sampled at a constant rate, $f_s$ samples/second, there is always an unlimited number of other continuous functions that fit the same set of samples. But only one of them is bandlimited to $\tfrac{1}{2}f_s$ cycles/second (hertz), (Note: The factor of $\tfrac{1}{2}$ has the units cycles/sample (see Sampling and Sampling theorem).) which means that its Fourier transform, $X(f),$ is $0$ for all $|f| \ge \tfrac{1}{2}f_s.$ The mathematical algorithms that are typically used to recreate a continuous function from samples create arbitrarily good approximations to this theoretical, but infinitely long, function. It follows that if the original function, $x(t),$ is bandlimited to $\tfrac{1}{2}f_s,$ which is called the Nyquist criterion, then it is the one unique function the interpolation algorithms are approximating. In terms of a function's own bandwidth $(B),$ as depicted here, the Nyquist criterion is often stated as $f_s > 2B.$ And $2B$ is called the Nyquist rate for functions with bandwidth $B.$ When the Nyquist criterion is not met $($say, $B > \tfrac{1}{2}f_s),$ a condition called aliasing occurs, which results in some inevitable differences between $x(t)$ and a reconstructed function that has less bandwidth. In most cases, the differences are viewed as distortion.

Fig 3: The top 2 graphs depict Fourier transforms of 2 different functions that produce the same results when sampled at a particular rate. The baseband function is sampled faster than its Nyquist rate, and the bandpass function is undersampled, effectively converting it to baseband. The lower graphs indicate how identical spectral results are created by the aliases of the sampling process.

=== Intentional aliasing ===
Figure 3 depicts a type of function called baseband or lowpass, because its positive-frequency range of significant energy is [0, B). When instead, the frequency range is (A, A+B), for some A > B, it is called bandpass, and a common desire (for various reasons) is to convert it to baseband. One way to do that is frequency-mixing (heterodyne) the bandpass function down to the frequency range (0, B). One of the possible reasons is to reduce the Nyquist rate for more efficient storage. And it turns out that one can directly achieve the same result by sampling the bandpass function at a sub-Nyquist sample-rate that is the smallest integer-sub-multiple of frequency A that meets the baseband Nyquist criterion: f_{s} > 2B. For a more general discussion, see bandpass sampling.

== Relative to signaling ==
Long before Harry Nyquist had his name associated with sampling, the term Nyquist rate was used differently, with a meaning closer to what Nyquist actually studied. Quoting Harold S. Black's 1953 book Modulation Theory, in the section Nyquist Interval of the opening chapter Historical Background:

"If the essential frequency range is limited to B cycles per second, 2B was given by Nyquist as the maximum number of code elements per second that could be unambiguously resolved, assuming the peak interference is less than half a quantum step. This rate is generally referred to as signaling at the Nyquist rate and 1/(2B) has been termed a Nyquist interval." (bold added for emphasis; italics from the original)

B in this context, related to the Nyquist ISI criterion, referring to the one-sided bandwidth rather than the total as considered in later usage.

According to the OED, Black's statement regarding 2B may be the origin of the term Nyquist rate.

Nyquist's famous 1928 paper was a study on how many pulses (code elements) could be transmitted per second, and recovered, through a channel of limited bandwidth. Signaling at the Nyquist rate meant putting as many code pulses through a telegraph channel as its bandwidth would allow. Shannon used Nyquist's approach when he proved the sampling theorem in 1948, but Nyquist did not work on sampling per se.

Black's later chapter on "The Sampling Principle" does give Nyquist some of the credit for some relevant math:

"Nyquist (1928) pointed out that, if the function is substantially limited to the time interval T, 2BT values are sufficient to specify the function, basing his conclusions on a Fourier series representation of the function over the time interval T."

== See also ==
- Nyquist frequency
- Nyquist ISI criterion
- Nyquist–Shannon sampling theorem
- Sampling (signal processing)
