= Hard sigmoid =

In artificial intelligence, especially computer vision and artificial neural networks, a hard sigmoid is non-smooth function used in place of a sigmoid function. These retain the basic shape of a sigmoid, rising from 0 to 1, but using simpler functions, especially piecewise linear functions or piecewise constant functions. These are preferred where speed of computation is more important than precision.

== Examples ==
The most extreme examples are the sign function or Heaviside step function, which go from −1 to 1 or 0 to 1 (which to use depends on normalization) at 0.

Other examples include the Theano library, which provides two approximations: ultra_fast_sigmoid, which is a multi-part piecewise approximation and hard_sigmoid, which is a 3-part piecewise linear approximation (output 0, line with slope 0.2, output 1).

== See also ==
- Easing function
- Heaviside step function
- Smoothstep
