= Piecewise property =

In mathematics, piecewise properties may be exemplified in:

== Calculus ==
A function property holds piecewise for a function, if the function can be piecewise-defined in a way that the property holds for every subdomain. Examples of functions with such piecewise properties are:

- Piecewise constant function, also known as a step function
- Piecewise linear function
- Piecewise continuous function
- Piecewise function or piecewise smooth function
- Piecewise differentiable function

== Other ==
The concept of piecewise-defined functions is often generalized:

- Piecewise linear curve
- Piecewise polynomial curve, also known as a spline (mathematics)
- Piecewise linear manifold
