= Non-separable wavelet =

Non-separable wavelets are multi-dimensional wavelets that are not directly implemented as tensor products of wavelets on some lower-dimensional space. They have been studied since 1992. They offer a few important advantages. Notably, using non-separable filters leads to more parameters in design, and consequently better filters. The main difference, when compared to the one-dimensional wavelets, is that multi-dimensional sampling requires the use of lattices (e.g., the quincunx lattice). The wavelet filters themselves can be separable or non-separable regardless of the sampling lattice. Thus, in some cases, the non-separable wavelets can be implemented in a separable fashion. Unlike separable wavelet, the non-separable wavelets are capable of detecting structures that are not only horizontal, vertical or diagonal (show less anisotropy).

== Examples ==
- Red-black wavelets
- Contourlets
- Shearlets
- Directionlets
- Steerable pyramids
- Non-separable schemes for tensor-product wavelets
