= Iverson notation =

Iverson notation can refer to:

- APL (programming language)
- Iverson bracket, in mathematics
