= Positive and negative parts =

Decomposition of real-valued functions

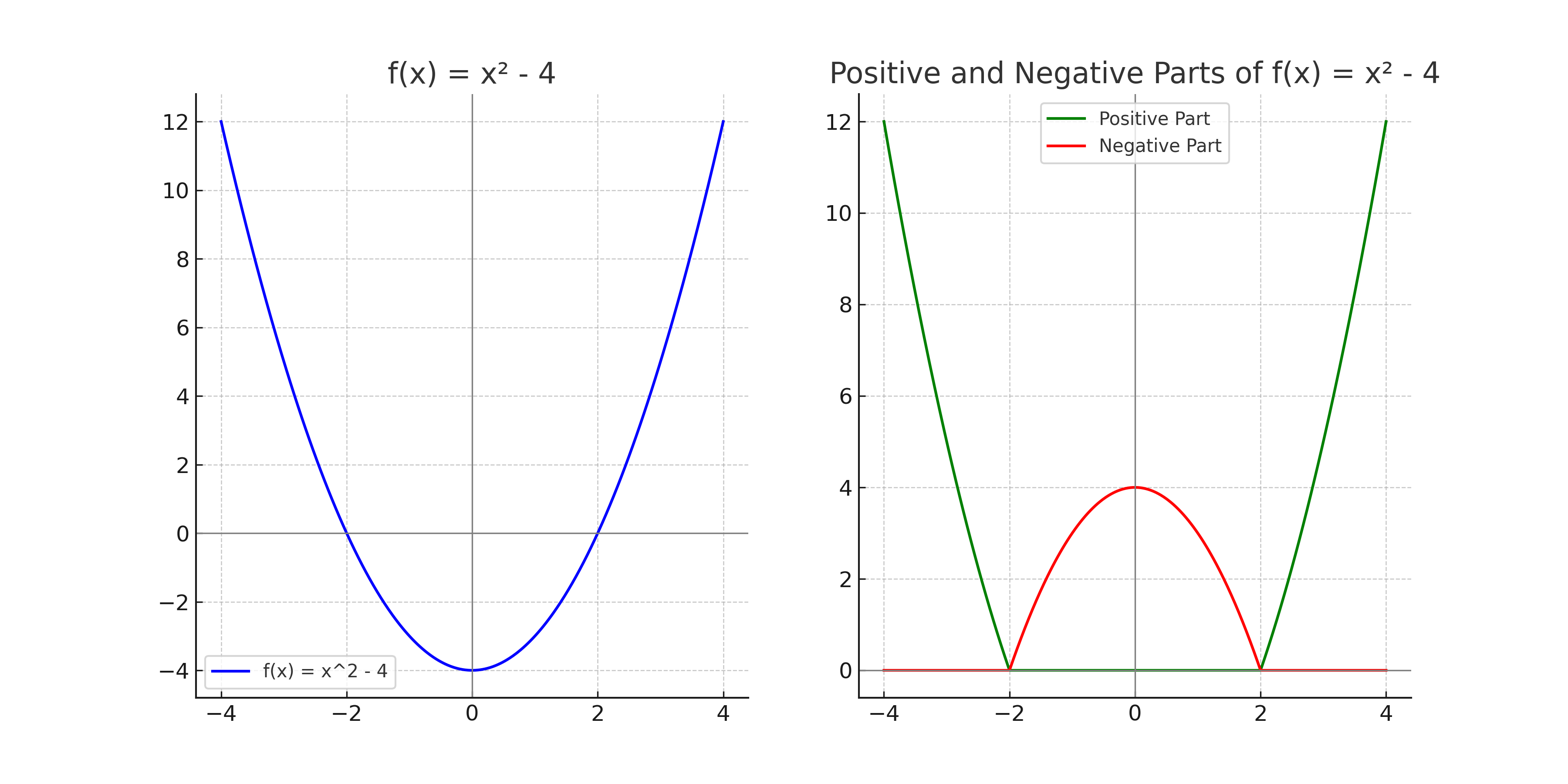
Positive and Negative Parts of f(x) = x^{2} − 4

In mathematics, the positive part of a real or extended real-valued function is defined by the formula
$$f^+(x) = \max(f(x),0) = \begin{cases}
f(x) & \text{ if } f(x) > 0 \\
0 & \text{ otherwise.}
\end{cases}$$

Intuitively, the graph of $f^+$ is obtained by taking the graph of $f$, 'chopping off' the part under the x-axis, and letting $f^+$ take the value zero there.

Similarly, the negative part of f is defined as
$$f^-(x) = \max(-f(x),0) = -\min(f(x),0) = \begin{cases}
-f(x) & \text{ if } f(x) < 0 \\
0 & \text{ otherwise}
\end{cases}$$

Note that both f^{+} and f^{−} are non-negative functions. A peculiarity of terminology is that the 'negative part' is not negative (like the imaginary part of a complex number is not imaginary).

The function f can be expressed in terms of f^{+} and f^{−} as
$$f = f^+ - f^-.$$

Also note that
$$|f| = f^+ + f^-.$$

Using these two equations one may express the positive and negative parts as
$$\begin{align}
f^+ &= \frac{|f| + f}{2} \\
f^- &= \frac{|f| - f}{2}.
\end{align}$$

Another representation, using the Iverson bracket is
$$\begin{align}
f^+ &=  [f>0]f \\
f^- &= -[f<0]f.
\end{align}$$

One may define the positive and negative part of any function with values in a linearly ordered group.

The unit ramp function is the positive part of the identity function.

== Measure-theoretic properties ==
Given a measurable space (X, Σ), an extended real-valued function f is measurable if and only if its positive and negative parts are. Therefore, if such a function f is measurable, so is its absolute value |f|, being the sum of two measurable functions. The converse, though, does not necessarily hold: for example, taking f as
$$f = 1_V - \frac{1}{2},$$
where V is a Vitali set, it is clear that f is not measurable, but its absolute value is, being a constant function.

The positive part and negative part of a function are used to define the Lebesgue integral for a real-valued function. Analogously to this decomposition of a function, one may decompose a signed measure into positive and negative parts — see the Hahn decomposition theorem.

== See also ==
- Rectifier (neural networks)
- Even and odd functions
- Real and imaginary parts
