= William Herrick Macaulay =

British mathematician

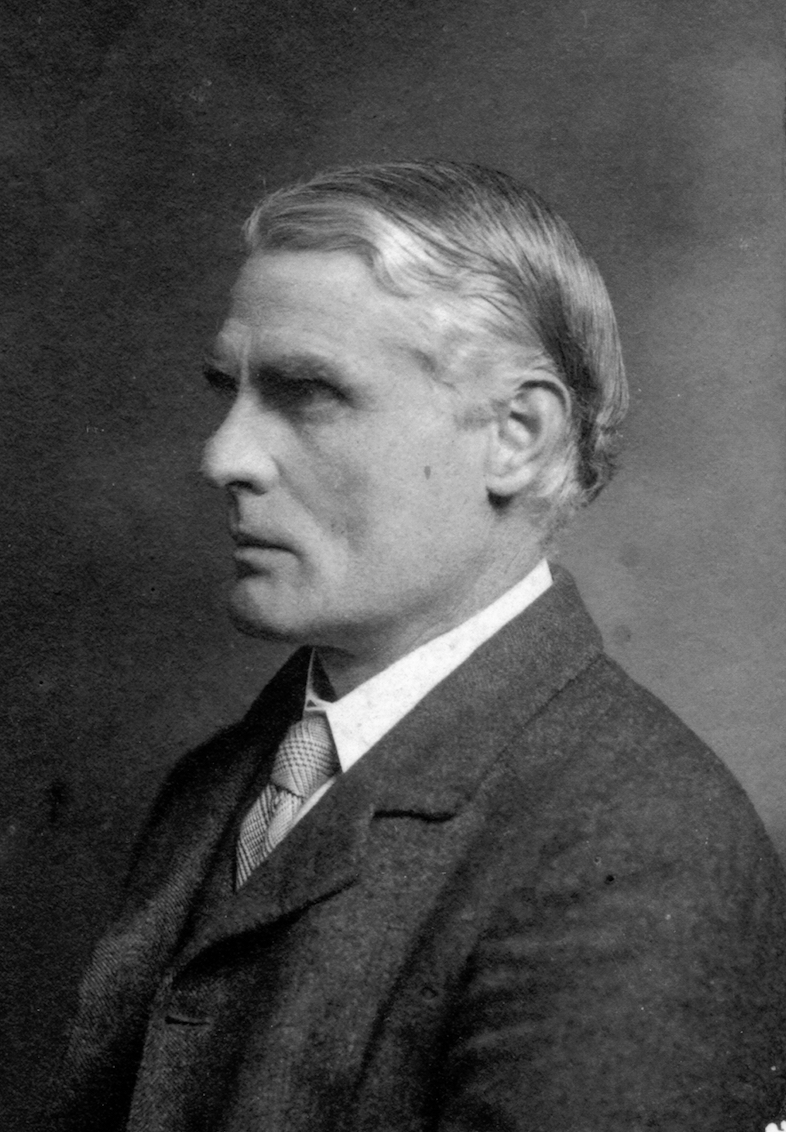
William Herrick Macaulay, Vice-Provost, Kings College Cambridge

William Herrick Macaulay (16 November 1853 – 28 November 1936) was a British mathematician, Fellow and Vice-Provost of King's College, Cambridge, and close friend of Karl Pearson. He also corresponded with John Maynard Keynes.

== Family ==
W. H. Macaulay was born in Hodnet, Shropshire, in 1853, son of the Rev. Samuel Herrick Macaulay, rector of Hodnet and grandson of the Rev. Aulay Macaulay. His brothers included George Campbell Macaulay, the father of Dame Rose Macaulay, and Reginald Macaulay. He never married, and died in Clent, near Stourbridge, Worcestershire, in 1936.

== Education, career and later life ==
Unlike his elder brother (who went to Eton), Macaulay was a pupil at Winchester College. Interested in the applied sciences rather than classics, upon leaving school he matriculated at Durham University, where he was awarded both a B.A. degree and a prize fellowship in 1874. In October that year, he began a further degree in mathematics at King's College, Cambridge, where he was made an Abbott Scholar and graduated as sixth Wrangler at the University of Cambridge in 1878.

Macaulay is best known for his work in engineering, most notably for his proposed mechanical technique in structural analysis for the purposes of beam or shaft deflection. He was made a Fellow of King's in 1879, which was followed by further appointments as University Lecturer in mathematics in 1883 and as College Lecturer in applied mechanics a year later. He subsequently helped to establish the Department of Engineering at Cambridge. He also worked for a time in a granite quarry.

Macaulay was appointed Bursar of King's in 1887, and following a decade-long role as Tutor in the college he became its Vice-Provost in 1918, remaining in post for six years until his retirement. T. E. B. Howarth, in his book on inter-war Cambridge, remarked that Macaulay was "the last fellow [of King's] to follow the old practice of keeping a horse and riding regularly to hounds."

== Bibliography ==
- "William Herrick Macaulay (FML874WH)". A Cambridge Alumni Database. University of Cambridge.
- ‘MACAULAY, William Herrick’, Who Was Who, A & C Black, an imprint of Bloomsbury Publishing plc, 1920–2008; online edn, Oxford University Press, Dec 2007 accessed 28 March 2013
- The Times, 30 November 1936; pg. 14; Issue 47545; col D. Mr. W. H. Macaulay King's College, Cambridge University.

== See also ==
- Alfred Clebsch
- Adhémar Jean Claude Barré de Saint-Venant
