= Crenel function =

In mathematics, the crenel function is a periodic discontinuous function P(x) defined as 1 for x belonging to a given interval and 0 outside of it. It can be presented as a difference between two Heaviside step functions of amplitude 1. It is used in crystallography to account for irregularities in the occupation of atomic sites by given atoms in solids, such as periodic domain structures, where some regions are enriched and some are depleted with certain atoms.

Mathematically,

$$P(x)=\begin{cases} 1, & x \in [-\Delta/2, \Delta/2], \\ 0, & x \notin [-\Delta/2, \Delta/2], \end{cases}$$

The coefficients of its Fourier series are

$$P_k(\Delta,x) = \frac{\exp(2\pi i\,kx)\sin(\pi k\Delta)}{\pi k} = \Delta\cdot\mathrm{sinc}(\pi k\Delta)\cdot\mathrm{e}^{2\pi i\,kx}.$$

with the Sinc function.
