= Easing function =

Function specifying how variables transition between values

In computer graphics, an easing function is a function that specifies how a variable transitions between two specific values, typically over time or space.

== See also ==
- Hard sigmoid
- Smooth transition function
- Smoothstep
