= Macaulay brackets =

Macaulay brackets are a notation used to describe the ramp function

$$\{x\} = \begin{cases} 0, & x < 0 \\ x, & x \ge 0. \end{cases}$$

A popular alternative transcription uses angle brackets, viz. $\langle x \rangle$. Another commonly used notation is $x$_{+} or $(x)$_{+} for the positive part of $x$, which avoids conflicts with $\{...\}$ for set notation.

== In engineering ==
Macaulay's notation is commonly used in the static analysis of bending moments of a beam. This is useful because shear forces applied on a member render the shear and moment diagram discontinuous. Macaulay's notation also provides an easy way of integrating these discontinuous curves to give bending moments, angular deflection, and so on. For engineering purposes, angle brackets are often used to denote the use of Macaulay's method.

$$\langle x-a\rangle^n = \begin{cases} 0, & x < a \\ (x-a)^n, & x \ge a. \end{cases}$$
$(n \ge 0)$

The above example simply states that the function takes the value $(x-a)^n$ for all x values larger than a. With this, all the forces acting on a beam can be added, with their respective points of action being the value of a.

A particular case is the unit step function,

$$\langle x-a\rangle^0 \equiv \{x-a\}^0 = \begin{cases} 0, & x < a \\ 1, & x \ge a. \end{cases}$$

== See also ==
- Singularity function
