= Bandelet (computer science) =

Bandelets are an orthonormal basis that is adapted to geometric boundaries. Bandelets can be interpreted as a warped wavelet basis. The motivation behind bandelets is to perform a transform on functions defined as smooth functions on smoothly bounded domains. As bandelet construction utilizes wavelets, many of the results follow. Similar approaches to take account of geometric structure were taken for contourlets and curvelets.

== See also ==
- Wavelet
- Multiresolution analysis
- Scale space
