= Zero to the power of zero =

Mathematical expression with disputed status

Zero to the power of zero, denoted as 0^{0}, is a mathematical expression with different interpretations depending on the context. In certain areas of mathematics, such as combinatorics and algebra, 0^{0} is defined as 1 because this simplifies many formulas and ensures consistency in operations involving exponents. For instance, defining 0^{0} = 1 aligns with the interpretation of choosing 0 elements from a set and simplifies polynomial and binomial expansions.

In other contexts, particularly in mathematical analysis, 0^{0} is often considered an indeterminate form. This is because the value of x^{y} as both x and y approach 0 can lead to different results based on the limiting process. The expression arises in limit problems and may result in a range of values or diverge to infinity, making it difficult to assign a single consistent value in these cases.

The treatment of 0^{0} varies across different computer programming languages and software. While many follow the convention 0^{0} = 1, others leave it undefined or return errors, depending on the context.

== Discrete exponents ==
Many widely used formulas involving natural-number exponents require 0^{0} to be defined as 1. For example, the following three interpretations of b^{0} make just as much sense for b = 0 as they do for positive integers b:

- The interpretation of b^{0} as an empty product assigns it the value 1.
- The combinatorial interpretation of b^{0} is the number of 0-tuples of elements from a b-element set; there is exactly one 0-tuple.
- The set-theoretic interpretation of b^{0} is the number of functions from the empty set to a b-element set; there is exactly one such function, namely, the empty function.

All three of these specialize to give 0^{0} = 1.

== Polynomials and power series ==
When evaluating polynomials, it is convenient to define 0^{0} as 1. A (real) polynomial is an expression of the form a_{0}x^{0} + ⋅⋅⋅ + a_{n}x^{n}, where x is an indeterminate, and the coefficients a_{i} are real numbers. Polynomials are added termwise, and multiplied by applying the distributive law and the usual rules for exponents. With these operations, polynomials form a ring R[x]. The multiplicative identity of R[x] is the polynomial x^{0}; that is, x^{0} times any polynomial p(x) is just p(x). Also, polynomials can be evaluated by specializing x to a real number. More precisely, for any given real number r, there is a unique unital R-algebra homomorphism ev_{r} : R[x] → R such that ev_{r}(x) = r. Because ev_{r} is unital, ev_{r}(x^{0}) = 1. That is, r^{0} = 1 for each real number r, including 0. The same argument applies with R replaced by any ring.

Defining 0^{0} = 1 is necessary for many polynomial identities. For example, the binomial theorem $(1+x)^{n}=\sum_{k=0}^{n}\binom{n}{k}x^{k}$ holds for x = 0 only if 0^{0} = 1.

Similarly, rings of power series require x^{0} to be defined as 1 for all specializations of x. For example, identities like $\frac{1}{1-x}=\sum_{n=0}^{\infty}x^n$ and $e^x=\sum_{n=0}^{\infty}\frac{x^n}{n!}$ hold for x = 0 only if 0^{0} = 1.

In order for the polynomial x^{0} to define a continuous function R → R, one must define 0^{0} = 1.

In calculus, the power rule $\frac{d}{dx}x^n=nx^{n-1}$ is valid for n = 1 at x = 0 only if 0^{0} = 1.

== Continuous exponents ==
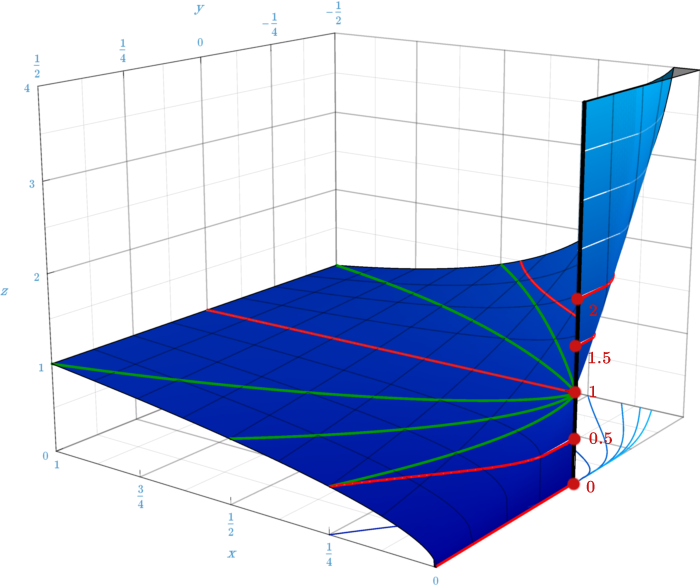
Plot of z = x^{y}. The red curves (with z constant) yield different limits as (x, y) approaches (0, 0). The green curves (of finite constant slope, y = ax) all yield a limit of 1.

Limits involving algebraic operations can often be evaluated by replacing subexpressions with their limits; if the resulting expression does not determine the original limit, the expression is known as an indeterminate form. The expression 0^{0} is an indeterminate form: Given real-valued functions f(t) and g(t) approaching 0 (as t approaches a real number or ±∞) with f(t) > 0, the limit of f(t)^{g(t)} can be any non-negative real number or +∞, or it can diverge, depending on f and g. For example, each limit below involves a function f(t)^{g(t)} with f(t), g(t) → 0 as t → 0^{+} (a one-sided limit), but their values are different:
$$\begin{align}
\lim_{t \to 0^+} {t}^{t} &= 1 , \\
\lim_{t \to 0^+} \left(e^{-1/t^2}\right)^t &= 0, \\
\lim_{t \to 0^+} \left(e^{-1/t^2}\right)^{-t} &= +\infty, \\
\lim_{t \to 0^+} \left(a^{-1/t}\right)^{-t} &= a.
\end{align}$$

Thus, the two-variable function x^{y}, though continuous on the set {(x, y) : x > 0}, cannot be extended to a continuous function on {(x, y) : x > 0} ∪ {(0, 0)}, no matter how one chooses to define 0^{0}.

On the other hand, if f and g are analytic functions on an open neighborhood of a number c, then f(t)^{g(t)} → 1 as t approaches c from any side on which f is positive. This and more general results can be obtained by studying the limiting behavior of the function $\log(f(t)^{g(t)})=g(t)\log f(t)$.

== Complex exponents ==
In the complex domain, the function z^{w} may be defined for nonzero z by choosing a branch of log z and defining z^{w} as e^{w log z}. This does not define 0^{w} since there is no branch of log z defined at z = 0, let alone in a neighborhood of 0.

== History ==
=== As a value ===
In 1752, Euler in Introductio in analysin infinitorum wrote that a^{0} = 1 and explicitly mentioned that 0^{0} = 1. An annotation attributed to Mascheroni in a 1787 edition of Euler's book Institutiones calculi differentialis offered the "justification"

$$0^0 = (a-a)^{n-n} = \frac{(a-a)^n}{(a-a)^n} = 1$$

as well as another more involved justification. In the 1830s, Libri published several further arguments attempting to justify the claim 0^{0} = 1, though these were far from convincing, even by standards of rigor at the time.

=== As a limiting form ===
Euler, when setting 0^{0} = 1, mentioned that consequently the values of the function 0^{x} take a "huge jump", from ∞ for x < 0, to 1 at x = 0, to 0 for x > 0. In 1814, Pfaff used a squeeze theorem argument to prove that x^{x} → 1 as x → 0^{+}.

On the other hand, in 1821 Cauchy explained why the limit of x^{y} as positive numbers x and y approach 0 while being constrained by some fixed relation could be made to assume any value between 0 and ∞ by choosing the relation appropriately. He deduced that the limit of the full two-variable function x^{y} without a specified constraint is "indeterminate". With this justification, he listed 0^{0} along with expressions like 0/0 in a table of indeterminate forms.

Apparently unaware of Cauchy's work, Möbius in 1834, building on Pfaff's argument, claimed incorrectly that f(x)^{g(x)} → 1 whenever f(x), g(x) → 0 as x approaches a number c (presumably f is assumed positive away from c). Möbius reduced to the case c = 0, but then made the mistake of assuming that each of f and g could be expressed in the form Px^{n} for some continuous function P not vanishing at 0 and some nonnegative integer n, which is true for analytic functions, but not in general. An anonymous commentator pointed out the unjustified step; then another commentator who signed his name simply as "S" provided the explicit counterexamples (e^{−1/x})^{x} → e^{−1} and (e^{−1/x})^{2x} → e^{−2} as x → 0^{+} and expressed the situation by writing that "0^{0} can have many different values".

=== Current situation ===
- Some authors define 0^{0} as 1 because it simplifies many theorem statements. According to Benson (1999), "The choice whether to define 0^{0} is based on convenience, not on correctness. If we refrain from defining 0^{0}, then certain assertions become unnecessarily awkward. ... The consensus is to use the definition 0^{0} = 1, although there are textbooks that refrain from defining 0^{0}." Knuth (1992) contends more strongly that 0^{0} "has to be 1"; he draws a distinction between the value 0^{0}, which should equal 1, and the limiting form 0^{0} (an abbreviation for a limit of f(t)^{g(t)} where f(t), g(t) → 0), which is an indeterminate form: "Both Cauchy and Libri were right, but Libri and his defenders did not understand why truth was on their side."
- Other authors leave 0^{0} undefined because 0^{0} is an indeterminate form.

The definition 0^{0} = 0 is used in the context of ultrametric spaces, although way more uncommon than defining 0^{0} = 1 or just leaving 0^{0} undefined.

== Treatment on computers ==
=== IEEE floating-point standard ===
The IEEE 754-2008 floating-point standard is used in the design of most floating-point libraries. It recommends a number of operations for computing a power:

- pown (whose exponent is an integer) treats 0^{0} as 1; see § Discrete exponents.
- pow (whose intent is to return a non-NaN result when the exponent is an integer, like pown) treats 0^{0} as 1.
- powr treats 0^{0} as NaN (Not-a-Number) due to the indeterminate form; see § Continuous exponents.

The pow variant is inspired by the pow function from C99, mainly for compatibility. It is useful mostly for languages with a single power function. The pown and powr variants have been introduced due to conflicting usage of the power functions and the different points of view (as stated above).

=== Programming languages ===
The C and C++ standards do not specify the result of 0^{0} (a domain error may occur). But for C, as of C99, if the normative annex F is supported, the result for real floating-point types is required to be 1 because there are significant applications for which this value is more useful than NaN (for instance, with discrete exponents); the result on complex types is not specified, even if the informative annex G is supported. The Java method java.lang.Math.pow, the .NET Framework method System.Math.Pow, Julia, and Python also treat 0^{0} as 1. Some languages document that their exponentiation operation corresponds to the pow function from the C mathematical library; this is the case with Lua's ^ operator and Perl's ** operator (where it is explicitly mentioned that the result of 0**0 is platform-dependent).

=== Mathematical and scientific software ===
R, SageMath, and PARI/GP evaluate x^{0} to 1. Mathematica simplifies x^{0} to 1 even if no constraints are placed on x; however, if 0^{0} is entered directly, it is treated as an error or indeterminate. Mathematica and PARI/GP further distinguish between integer and floating-point values: If the exponent is a zero of integer type, they return a 1 of the type of the base; exponentiation with a floating-point exponent of value zero is treated as undefined, indeterminate or error.

== See also ==
- 0/0
