= IH =

IH may refer to:

== In science and technology ==
=== In medicine ===
- Immune-histochemistry
- intrauterine hypoxia
- Hepatitis A (infectious hepatitis)
- Idiopathic hypersomnia
- Intracranial hypertension

=== Other uses in science and technology ===
- Hydrogen iodide
- Induction heating

- Induction heater

- Industrial hygiene, the control and prevention of hazards in a work environment
- I_{h}, full icosahedral symmetry

== Other uses ==
- ih, see List of Latin-script digraphs#I
- Információs Hivatal, a Hungarian intelligence office
- International House World Organisation
- International Harvester, a manufacturer of agricultural machinery, construction equipment, trucks, and other products
- IH, notation for intersection homology groups
- Interstate Highway

== See also ==
- HI (disambiguation)
