= Induction shrink fitting =

Induction shrink fitting refers to the use of induction heater technology to pre-heat metal components between 150 °C (302 °F) and 300 °C (572 °F) thereby causing them to expand and allow for the insertion or removal of another component. Typically the lower temperature range is used on metals such as aluminium and higher temperatures are used on metals such as low/medium carbon steels. The process avoids the changing of mechanical properties whilst allowing components to be worked. Metals typically expand in response to heating and contract on cooling; this dimensional response to temperature change is expressed as a coefficient of thermal expansion.

== Process ==
Induction heating is a non contact heating process which uses the principle of electromagnetism induction to produce heat in a work-piece. In this case thermal expansion is used in a mechanical application to fit parts over one another, e.g. a bushing can be fitted over a shaft by making its inner diameter slightly smaller than the diameter of the shaft, then heating it until it fits over the shaft, and allowing it to cool after it has been pushed over the shaft, thus achieving a 'shrink fit'. By placing a conductive material into a strong alternating magnetic field, electric current can be made to flow in the metal thereby creating heat due to the I^{2}R losses in the material. The current generated flows predominantly in the surface layer. The depth of this layer being dictated by the frequency of the alternating field and the permeability of the material. Induction heaters for shrink fitting fall into two broad categories:

- Mains frequency (MF) units using magnetic cores (iron)
- Solid state MF and radio frequency (RF) heaters

=== Mains frequency units using iron cores ===
Often referred to as a bearing heater, the mains frequency unit employs standard transformer principles for its operation. An internal winding is wound around a laminated core similar to a standard mains transformer. The core is then passed through the work-piece and when the primary coil is energised, a magnetic flux is created around the core. The work-piece acts as a short circuit secondary of the transformer created, and due to the laws of induction, a current flows in the work-piece and heat is generated. The core is normally hinged or clamped in some way to allow loading or unloading, which is usually a manual operation. To cover variations in part diameter, the majority of units will have spare cores available which help to optimise performance. Once the part is heated to the correct temperature, assembly can take place either by hand or in the relevant jig or machine press.

==== Power consumption ====
Bearing heaters typically range from 1 kVA to 25 kVA and are used to heat parts from 1 to 650 kg (2.2 to 1,433.0 lb), dependent upon the application. The power required is a function of the weight, target temperature and cycle time to aid selection many manufacturers publish graphs and charts.

==== Industries and applications ====
- Railway - gearboxes, wheels, transmissions
- Machine tools - lathe gearboxes, mills
- Steel works - roll bearings, roll neck rings
- Power generation - various generator components

Due to the need to insert a core and also that to be effective, the core has to be in relatively close proximity to the bore of the part to be heated, there are many application in which the above bearing heater type approach is not feasible.

=== Solid state MF and RF heaters ===
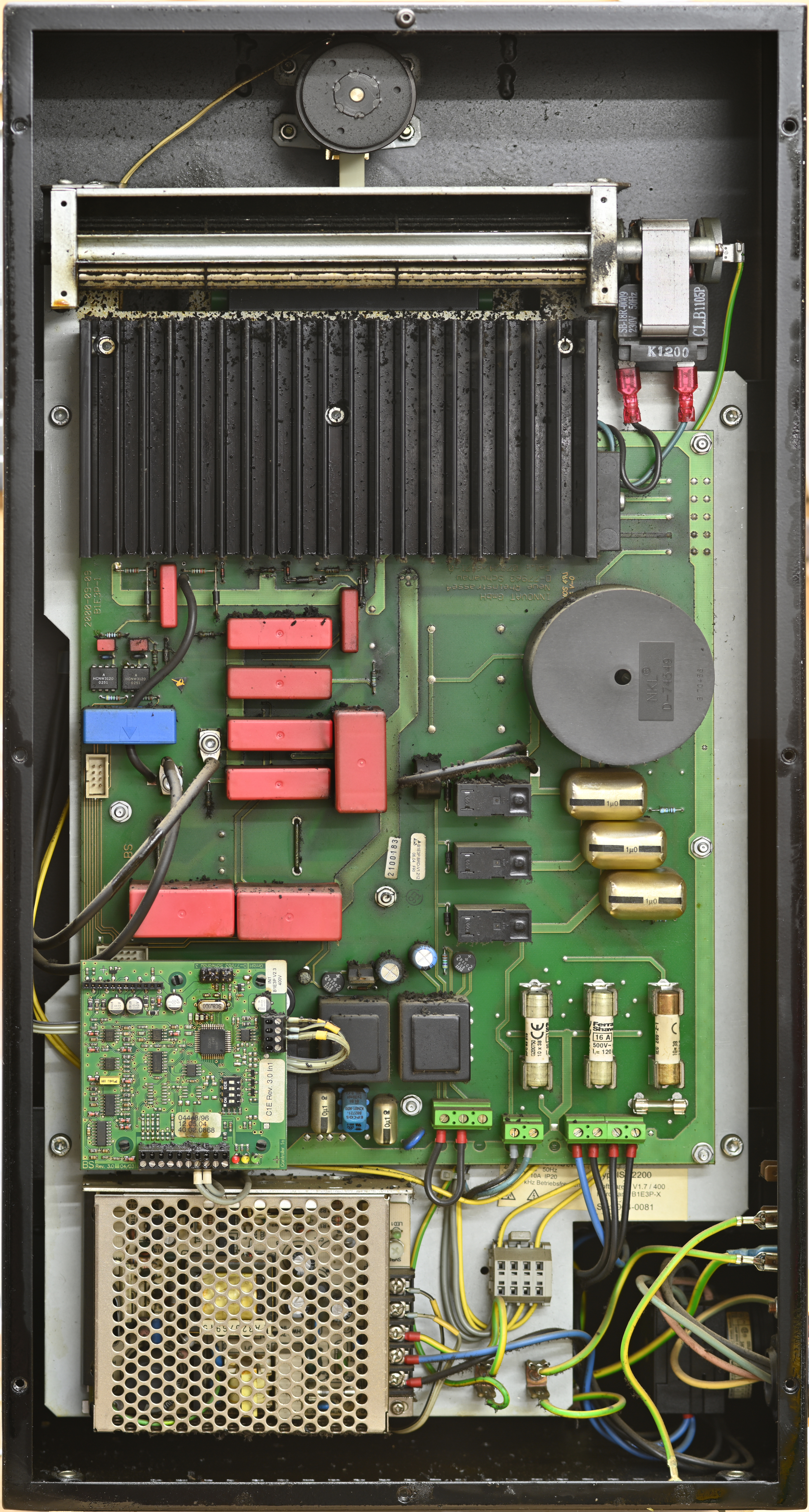
Electronics of a 7 kW solid-state bench-top induction heater using three-phase power.

In those cases where operational complexities negate the use of a cored mains frequency approach, the standard RF or MF induction heater can be used. This type of unit uses turns of copper tube wound into an electromagnetic coil. There are no cores required, the coil needs to simply surround or be inserted into the part to be heated this makes automating the process straightforward. A further advantage is the ability to not only shrink fit parts but also remove them.

The RF and MF heaters used for induction shrink fitting vary in power from a few kilowatts to many megawatts and depending on the component geometry/diameter/cross section can vary in frequency from 1 kHz to 200 kHz, although the majority of applications use the range between 1 kHz and 100 kHz.

In general terms, it is best to use the lowest practical frequency and a low power density when undertaking shrink fitting as this will generally provide more evenly distributed heat. The exception to this rule is when using heat to remove parts from shafts. In these cases it is often best to shock the component with a rapid heat, this also has the advantage of shortening the time cycle and preventing heat build up in the shaft which can lead to problems with both parts expanding.

In order to select the correct power it is necessary to first calculate the thermal energy required to raise the material to the required temperature in the time allotted. This can be done using the heat content of the material which is normal expressed in kW hours per tonne, the weight of metal to be processed and the time cycle. Once this has been established other factors such as radiated losses from the component, coil losses and other system losses need to be factored in. Traditionally this process involved lengthy and complex calculations in conjunction with a mixture of practical experience and empirical formula. Modern techniques use finite element analysis and other computer-aided manufacturing techniques, however as with all such methods a thorough working knowledge of the induction heating process is still required. When deciding on the correct approach it is often necessary to consider the overall size and thermal conductivity of the work-piece and its expansion characteristics in order to ensure that enough soak time is allowed to create an even heat throughout the component.

==== Output frequency ====
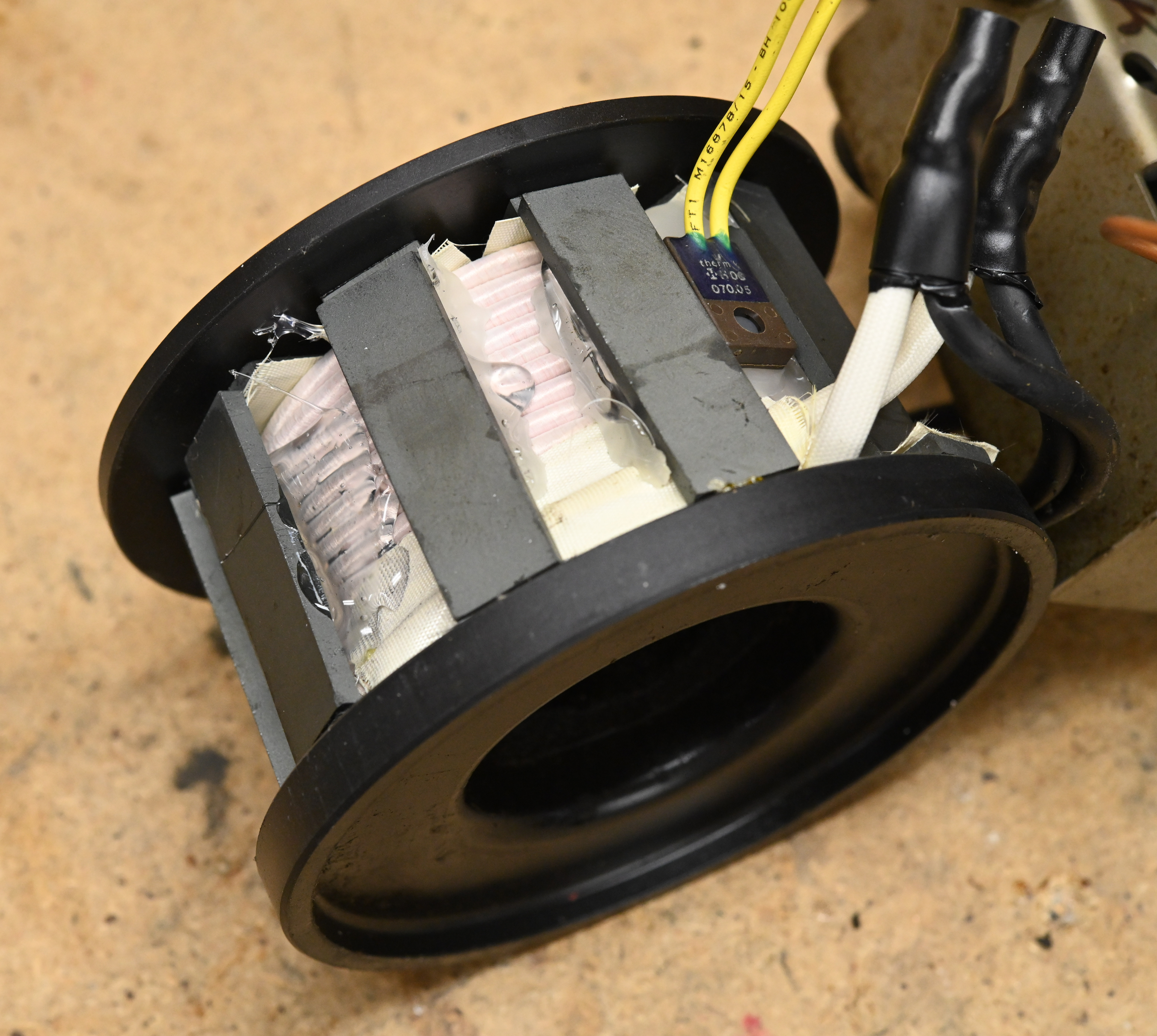
Induction coil operating at 10-14 kHz, designed for shrink-fitting machine tools.

As shrink fitting requires a uniform heating of the component to be expanded, it is best to try to use the lowest practical frequency when approaching heating for shrink fitting. Again the exception to this rule can be when removing parts from shafts.

==== Industries and applications ====
There are a huge number of industries and applications which benefit from induction shrink fitting or removal using solid state RF and MF heaters. In practice, the methodology employed can vary from a simple manual approach where an operator assembles or disassembles the parts to fully automatic pneumatic and hydraulic press arrangements.

- Automotive starter rings onto flywheels
- Timing gears to crankshafts
- Motor stators into motor bodies
- Motor shafts into stators
- Removal and re-fitting of a gas turbine impeller
- Removal and re-fitting of hollow bolts in electrical generators
- Assembly of high precision roller bearings
- Shrink fitting of 2-stroke crankshafts for ship engines

== Advantages & disadvantages ==
Advantages:

- Process controllability - Unlike a traditional electric or gas furnace the induction system requires no pre-heat cycle or controlled shutdown. The heat is available on demand. In addition to the benefits of rapid availability in the event of a downstream interruption to production, the power can be switched off thus saving energy.
- Energy efficiency - Due to the heat being generated within the component energy transfer is extremely efficient. The induction heater heats only the part not the atmosphere around it.
- Process consistency - The induction heating process produces extremely uniform consistent heat this often allows less heat to be used for a given process.
- No naked flame - This allows induction heating to be used in a wide variety of applications in volatile environments in particular in petrochemical applications.

The main disadvantage of this process is that, in general, it is limited to components which have a cylindrical shape.

== See also ==
- Induction hardening
- Induction forging
- Induction heater
