= Simatec ag =

simatec ag
- Type: Private (Aktiengesellschaft)
- Industry: Industrial technology
- Founded: 1983; 43 years ago in Herzogenbuchsee, Switzerland
- Founders: Max Wyssmann; Silvia Wyssmann
- Headquarters: Wangen an der Aare, Switzerland
- Area served: Worldwide
- Key people: Mischa Wyssmann (CEO since 2005)
- Products: Automatic lubricators (simalube); induction heaters (simatherm); bearing tools (simatool)
- Subsidiaries: simatec inc simatec gmbh simatec china simatec brazil
- Website: www.simatec.com

simatec ag is a Swiss industrial company that manufactures maintenance equipment for rolling-element bearings, including automatic lubricators, induction heaters, and assembly tools. It is headquartered in Wangen an der Aare, in the canton of Bern, and operates subsidiaries in the United States, Germany, and China.

== History ==
simatec was founded in 1983 by Max and Silvia Wyssmann in Herzogenbuchsee, Switzerland. In its early years, the company developed induction heaters for industrial bearings and operated from the founders' home.

In 1994, simatec introduced the simalube automatic lubricator, based on a gas-generating cell that dispenses lubricant continuously. The lubricator was later produced in several sizes.

In 2002, simatec relocated from Herzogenbuchsee to a new building in Wangen an der Aare. In 2005, Mischa Wyssmann assumed operational management of the company, and in 2008, ownership passed to him. During this period, simatec introduced the simatherm and simatool brands for its induction heaters and bearing maintenance tools. In 2013, the company announced a CHF 4 million expansion of its Wangen site, which roughly doubled its floor space. The new building was completed in 2014. Further product developments included a portable induction heater in 2011 and a compact lubricant dispenser in 2013, followed by the simalube Impulse pressure booster in 2015. The company automated parts of its production line in 2019.

In 2021, simatec introduced Bluetooth-enabled lubricators and a companion mobile application for monitoring lubrication systems. The company updated its corporate identity in 2022. In June 2024, the company's US subsidiary moved to a new factory and office building in Charlotte, North Carolina.

== Products ==
simatec's products are organised under three brands. simalube is the automatic single-point lubricator that supplies lubricant continuously to bearings and other lubrication points over extended periods. simatherm covers induction heaters used to heat bearings and other ring-shaped metal parts before mounting. simatool consists of tools for the mounting and dismounting of bearings.
