= Pulse wave =

Periodic rectangular waveform

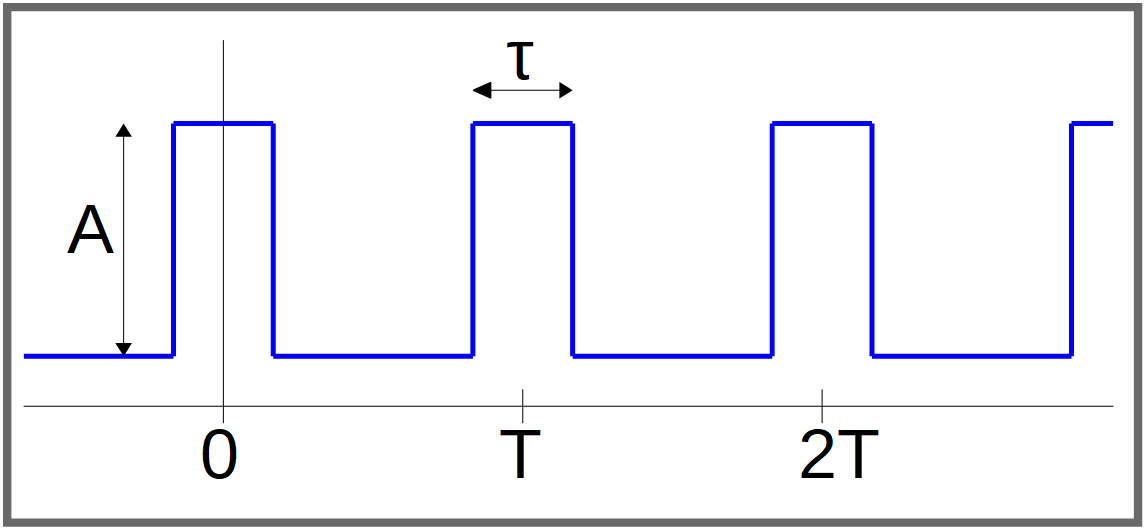
A pulse wave's duty cycle D is the ratio between pulse duration 𝜏 and period T.

A pulse wave with 220 Hz

A pulse wave, pulse train, or rectangular wave is a sequence of discrete pulses occurring in a signal over time. Typically, these pulses are of similar shape and are evenly spaced in time, forming a periodic or near-periodic sequence. Pulse waves outputs are widely used in tachometers, speedometers and encoders. Such pulse sequences appear in multiple fields of technology and engineering, where a pulse wave often denotes a series of electrical pulses generated by a sensor (for example, teeth of a rotating gear inducing pulses in a pickup sensor), or pulse wave is connected to signal processing and computer graphics, where a pulse wave is treated as a mathematical signal or function that repeats with a fixed period.

== Definition and mechanism ==
Several key parameters define the characteristics of a pulse wave. The pulse duration, often denoted by the Greek letter tau (τ) or as t_{1}, represents the length of time for which each pulse is active, typically at its high level. Following each pulse is a period of inactivity known as the pulse separation, indicated as t_{2}. The sum of the pulse duration and the pulse separation constitutes the period (T) of the wave, representing one complete cycle (T = t_{1} + t_{2}). A crucial parameter derived from these is the duty cycle (D), which is the ratio of the pulse duration to the total period (D = τ/T), often expressed as a percentage. Notably, a pulse wave with a 50% duty cycle, where the pulse duration is equal to the pulse separation, is known as a square wave. The pulse repetition frequency (PRF or f_{r}) quantifies the number of pulses that occur within one second and is the inverse of the period (f_{r} = 1/T). Another defining characteristic is the mark-space ratio, which describes the relationship between the active portion (mark) and the inactive portion (space) of the cycle, specifically the ratio of pulse duration to pulse separation (t_{1}/t_{2}).

Unlike sinusoidal waveforms, a pulse wave exhibits a more abrupt, rectangular shape with clearly defined high and low levels, making it a non-sinusoidal waveform that repeats its pattern at regular intervals, thus classifying it as periodic. Mathematically, pulse waves can be represented as a sum of sinusoidal components with different frequencies and amplitudes through a process known as Fourier series expansion.

== Fundamental principles ==
Pulse waves are typically generated using electronic circuits specifically designed for this purpose, commonly referred to as pulse generators. The fundamental operation of a pulse generator often involves the use of multivibrator circuits or digital timing circuits. These circuits are capable of producing repetitive pulses with controllable parameters such as frequency, pulse width, amplitude, and the delay between pulses. Various techniques are employed in pulse generators to create these waveforms, including the use of digital counters for precise timing of longer pulses, resistor-capacitor (RC) networks or switched delay lines for shorter durations (ranging from nanoseconds to microseconds), and purely digital techniques for accurate control over repetition rate and duration.

Pulse wave generation can be categorized into two main types: finite pulse wave generation, which produces a predetermined number of pulses, and continuous pulse wave generation, which outputs a stream of pulses indefinitely. For more intricate pulse patterns, buffered pulse wave generation techniques are utilized, allowing for the creation of user-defined sequences of pulses with variable idle and active times. The precision in controlling these parameters is critical for adapting the pulse wave signal to the specific requirements of its intended application.

== History and development ==
The use of pulsewave-based signals can be traced back to the early days of technology, with significant applications emerging over time. In the realm of communication, early systems like telegraphy relied on pulsed signals to transmit information. A notable early application in safety-critical systems was the development of pulse code cab signaling for railways, pioneered by the Pennsylvania Railroad in the 1920s. This system utilized pulsed alternating current (AC) track circuits operating at a specific carrier frequency (initially 60 Hz, later 100 Hz) to convey signal aspects directly to the locomotive cab. The rate of the pulses (e.g., 180 pulses per minute for a Clear aspect) indicated the permissible speed and conditions ahead.

Over time, this system evolved to include more sophisticated features like automatic wave stop and speed control, and overlay systems were developed to accommodate higher operating speeds. The development of radar technology, particularly during World War II, also heavily relied on the transmission and reception of pulse waves to detect and locate distant objects. As communication technologies advanced, various pulse modulation techniques emerged, allowing for the encoding of analog or digital information onto a pulse wave by varying parameters like amplitude (pulse-amplitude modulation - PAM), width (pulse-width modulation - PWM), position (pulse-position modulation - PPM), or by converting the signal into a digital code represented by pulses (pulse-code modulation - PCM). More recently, pulse waves have become indispensable in laser technology, with lasers capable of generating pulses of extremely short durations (femtoseconds) or controlled repetition rates (Q-switched lasers) finding applications in diverse fields. In neuroscience, precisely timed pulse waves are used for electrical and optical stimulation of neural tissues to study brain function and develop therapeutic interventions.

== Applications ==
In signal processing and communication systems, pulse waves serve as carrier signals in numerous digital pulse modulation techniques. Pulse-width modulation (PWM), where the width or duration of the pulses is varied, is widely used for controlling the average power delivered to electrical devices, with applications in motor speed control, power delivery systems, voltage regulation, audio effects and amplification, and dimming of LEDs. Pulse Position Modulation (PPM) encodes information in the timing or position of the pulses and is known for its good noise immunity, making it suitable for applications like radar systems and remote control devices. Pulse-code modulation (PCM) is a crucial technique for converting analog signals into a digital format by sampling the analog signal and quantizing the amplitude into a series of digital pulses or codes, used extensively in technologies like CDs, PCM recorders, and telecommunications for transmitting analog signals as digital data. Other pulse modulation techniques include Pulse Frequency Modulation (PFM), where the frequency of the pulses is varied, and pulse-density modulation (PDM), where the density of pulses within a given time period is modulated. Pulse waves are also essential for high-speed data transmission in modern telecommunications networks, ensuring reliable and efficient communication.

In neuroscience research and therapeutic applications, pulse waves are used to precisely stimulate neural tissue. Electrical stimulation using pulse waves is employed in basic studies on nociception and neuropathic pain and for diagnosing neuropathies. Optogenetics utilizes light pulses to control the activity of genetically modified neurons, offering a powerful tool for studying brain circuits and behavior. Open-source devices like Pulse Pal have been developed to allow researchers to generate custom pulse waves for precise experimental manipulations. Additionally, pulse wave gating techniques are used in in vivo imaging, such as two-photon microscopy, to enhance signal levels and improve image quality in deeper regions of the brain.

The harmonic spectrum of a pulse wave is determined by the duty cycle. Acoustically, the rectangular wave has been described variously as having a narrow or thin, nasal/buzzy/biting, clear, resonant, rich, round and bright sound. Pulse waves are used in many Steve Winwood songs, such as "While You See a Chance".

== Frequency-domain representation ==
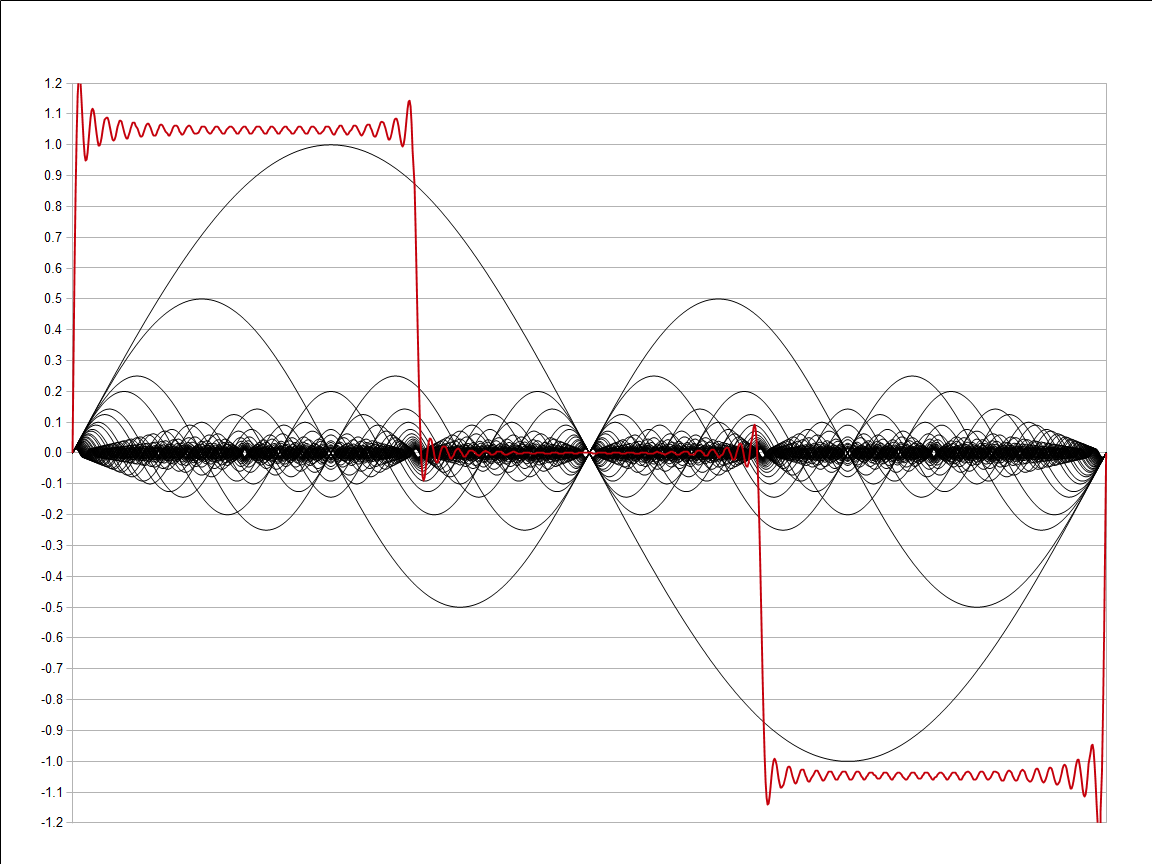
Fourier series of a 33.3̅% pulse wave, first fifty harmonics (summation in red)

The Fourier series expansion for a rectangular pulse wave with period $T$, amplitude $A$ and pulse length $\tau$ is

$$x(t) = A \frac{\tau}{T} + \frac{2A}{\pi} \sum_{n=1}^{\infty} \left(\frac{1}{n} \sin\left(\pi n\frac{\tau}{T}\right) \cos\left(2\pi nft\right)\right)$$
where $f = \frac{1}{T}$.

Equivalently, if duty cycle $d = \frac{\tau}{T}$ is used, and $\omega = 2\pi f$:
$$x(t) = Ad + \frac{2A}{\pi} \sum_{n=1}^{\infty} \left(\frac{1}{n}\sin\left(\pi n d \right)\cos\left(n \omega t \right) \right)$$

Note that, for symmetry, the starting time ($t=0$) in this expansion is halfway through the first pulse.

Alternatively, $x(t)$ can be written using the Sinc function, using the definition $\operatorname{sinc}x = \frac{\sin \pi x}{\pi x}$, as
$$x(t) = A \frac{\tau}{T} \left(1 + 2\sum_{n=1}^\infty \left(\operatorname{sinc}\left(n\frac{\tau}{T} \right)\cos\left(2\pi n f t\right) \right) \right)$$
or with $d = \frac{\tau}{T}$ as
$$x(t) = A d \left(1 + 2\sum_{n=1}^\infty \left(\operatorname{sinc}\left(n d\right)\cos\left(2\pi n f t\right) \right) \right)$$
A pulse wave can be created by subtracting a sawtooth wave from a phase-shifted version of itself. If the sawtooth waves are bandlimited, the resulting pulse wave is bandlimited, too. The pulse waveforms are non-sinusoidal that is the periodic version of the rectangular function. It is held high a percent each cycle (period) called the duty cycle and for the remainder of each cycle is low. A duty cycle of 50% produces a square wave, a specific case of a rectangular wave. The average level of a rectangular wave is also given by the duty cycle.

A pulse wave is used as a basis for other waveforms that modulate an aspect of the pulse wave. In pulse-width modulation (PWM) information is encoded by varying the duty cycle of a pulse wave. Pulse-amplitude modulation (PAM) encodes information by varying the amplitude.

== See also ==
- Gibbs phenomenon
- Pulse shaping
- Sinc function
- Sine wave
