= Induction hardening =

Process in metallurgy

Induction hardening is a type of surface hardening in which a metal part is induction-heated and then quenched. The quenched metal undergoes a martensitic transformation, increasing the hardness and brittleness of the part. Induction hardening is used to selectively harden areas of a part or assembly without affecting the properties of the part as a whole.

== Process ==
Induction heating is a non contact heating process which uses the principle of electromagnetic induction to produce heat inside the surface layer of a work-piece. By placing a conductive material into a strong alternating magnetic field, electric current can be made to flow in the material thereby creating heat due to the I^{2}R losses in the material. In magnetic materials, further heat is generated below the curie point due to hysteresis losses. The current generated flows predominantly in the surface layer, the depth of this layer being dictated by the frequency of the alternating field, the surface power density, the permeability of the material, the heat time and the diameter of the bar or material thickness. By quenching this heated layer in water, oil, or a polymer based quench, the surface layer is altered to form a martensitic structure which is harder than the base metal.

=== Definition ===
A widely used process for the surface hardening of steel. The components are heated by means of an alternating magnetic field to a temperature within or above the transformation range followed by immediate quenching. The core of the component remains unaffected by the treatment and its physical properties are those of the bar from which it was machined, whilst the hardness of the case can be within the range 37/58 HRC. Carbon and alloy steels with an equivalent carbon content in the range 0.40/0.45% are most suitable for this process.

A large alternating current is driven through a coil, generating a very intense and rapidly changing magnetic field in the space within. The workpiece to be heated is placed within this alternating magnetic field where eddy currents are generated within the workpiece and resistance leads to Joule heating of the metal.

Many mechanical parts, such as shafts, gears, and springs, are subjected to surface treatments after machining in order to improve wear behavior. The effectiveness of these treatments depends both on surface materials properties modification and on the introduction of residual stress. Among these treatments, induction hardening is one of the most widely employed to improve component durability. It determines in the work-piece a tough core with tensile residual stresses and a hard surface layer with compressive stress, which have proved to be very effective in extending the component fatigue life and wear resistance.

Induction surface hardened low alloyed medium carbon steels are widely used for critical automotive and machine applications which require high wear resistance. Wear resistance behavior of induction hardened parts depends on hardening depth and the magnitude and distribution of residual compressive stress in the surface layer.

=== History ===
The basis of all induction heating systems was discovered in 1831 by Michael Faraday. Faraday proved that by winding two coils of wire around a common magnetic core it was possible to create a momentary electromotive force in the second winding by switching the electric current in the first winding on and off. He further observed that if the current was kept constant, no EMF was induced in the second winding and that this current flowed in opposite directions subject to whether the current was increasing or decreasing in the circuit.

Faraday concluded that an electric current can be produced by a changing magnetic field. As there was no physical connection between the primary and secondary windings, the emf in the secondary coil was said to be induced and so Faraday's law of induction was born. Once discovered, these principles were employed over the next century or so in the design of dynamos (electrical generators and electric motors, which are variants of the same thing) and in forms of electrical transformers. In these applications, any heat generated in either the electrical or magnetic circuits was felt to be undesirable. Engineers went to great lengths and used laminated cores and other methods to minimise the effects.

Early last century the principles were explored as a means to melt steel, and the motor generator was developed to provide the power required for the induction furnace. After general acceptance of the methodology for melting steel, engineers began to explore other possibilities for the use of the process. It was already understood that the depth of current penetration in steel was a function of its magnetic permeability, resistivity and the frequency of the applied field. Engineers at Midvale Steel and The Ohio Crankshaft Company drew on this knowledge to develop the first surface hardening induction heating systems using motor generators.

The need for rapid easily automated systems led to massive advances in the understanding and use of the induction hardening process and by the late 1950s many systems using motor generators and thermionic emission triode oscillators were in regular use in a vast array of industries. Modern day induction heating units use the latest in semiconductor technology and digital control systems to develop a range of powers from 1 kW to many megawatts.

=== Principal methods ===
==== Single shot hardening ====
In single shot systems the component is held statically or rotated in the coil and the whole area to be treated is heated simultaneously for a pre-set time followed by either a flood quench or a drop quench system. Single shot is often used in cases where no other method will achieve the desired result for example for flat face hardening of hammers, edge hardening complex shaped tools or the production of small gears.

In the case of shaft hardening a further advantage of the single shot methodology is the production time compared with progressive traverse hardening methods. In addition the ability to use coils which can create longitudinal current flow in the component rather than diametric flow can be an advantage with certain complex geometry.

There are disadvantages with the single shot approach. The coil design can be an extremely complex and involved process. Often the use of ferrite or laminated loading materials is required to influence the magnetic field concentrations in given areas thereby to refine the heat pattern produced. Another drawback is that much more power is required due to the increased surface area being heated compared with a traverse approach.

==== Traverse hardening ====
In traverse hardening systems the work piece is passed through the induction coil progressively and a following quench spray or ring is used. Traverse hardening is used extensively in the production of shaft type components such as axle shafts, excavator bucket pins, steering components, power tool shafts and drive shafts. The component is fed through a ring type inductor which normally features a single turn. The width of the turn is dictated by the traverse speed, the available power and frequency of the generator. This creates a moving band of heat which when quenched creates the hardened surface layer. The quench ring can be either integral a following arrangement or a combination of both subject to the requirements of the application. By varying speed and power it is possible to create a shaft which is hardened along its whole length or just in specific areas and also to harden shafts with steps in diameter or splines. It is normal when hardening round shafts to rotate the part during the process to ensure any variations due to concentricity of the coil and the component are removed.

Traverse methods also feature in the production of edge components, such as paper knives, leather knives, lawnmower bottom blades, and hacksaw blades. These types of application normally use a hairpin coil or a transverse flux coil which sits over the edge of the component. The component is progressed through the coil and a following spray quench consisting of nozzles or drilled blocks.

Many methods are used to provide the progressive movement through the coil and both vertical and horizontal systems are used. These normally employ a digital encoder and programmable logic controller for the positional control, switching, monitoring, and setting. In all cases the speed of traverse needs to be closely controlled and consistent as variation in speed will have an effect on the depth of hardness and the hardness value achieved.

=== Equipment ===
==== Power required ====
Power supplies for induction hardening vary in power from a few kilowatts to hundreds of kilowatts depending on the size of the component to be heated and the production method employed i.e. single shot hardening, traverse hardening or submerged hardening.

In order to select the correct power supply it is first necessary to calculate the surface area of the component to be heated. Once this has been established then a variety of methods can be used to calculate the power density required, heat time and generator operating frequency. Traditionally this was done using a series of graphs, complex empirical calculations and experience. Modern techniques typically use finite element analysis and computer-aided manufacturing techniques, however as with all such methods a thorough working knowledge of the induction heating process is still required.

For single shot applications the total area to be heated needs to be calculated. In the case of traverse hardening the circumference of the component is multiplied by the face width of the coil. Care must be exercised when selecting a coil face width that it is practical to construct the coil of the chosen width and that it will live at the power required for the application.

==== Frequency ====
Induction heating systems for hardening are available in a variety of different operating frequencies typically from 1 kHz to 400 kHz. Higher and lower frequencies are available but typically these will be used for specialist applications. The relationship between operating frequency and current penetration depth and therefore hardness depth is inversely proportional. i.e. the lower the frequency the deeper the case.

Examples of frequencies for various case depths and material diameters
| Case depth [mm] | Bar diameter [mm] | Frequency [kHz] |
|---|---|---|
| 0.8 to 1.5 | 5 to 25 | 200 to 400 |
| 1.5 to 3.0 | 10 to 50 | 10 to 100 |
| 1.5 to 3.0 | >50 | 3 to 10 |
| 3.0 to 10.0 | 20 to 50 | 3 to 10 |
| 3.0 to 10.0 | 50 to 100 | 1 to 3 |
| 3.0 to 10.0 | >100 | 1 |

The above table is purely illustrative, good results can be obtained outside these ranges by balancing power densities, frequency and other practical considerations including cost which may influence the final selection, heat time and coil width. As well as the power density and frequency, the time the material is heated for will influence the depth to which the heat will flow by conduction. The time in the coil can be influenced by the traverse speed and the coil width, however this will also have an effect on the overall power requirement or the equipment throughput.

It can be seen from the above table that the selection of the correct equipment for any application can be extremely complex as more than one combination of power, frequency and speed can be used for a given result. However in practice many selections are immediately obvious based on previous experience and practicality.

=== Advantages ===
- Fast process, no holding time is required, hence more production rate
- No scaling or decarburizing
- More case depth, up to 8 mm
- Selective hardening
- High wear and fatigue resistance

=== Applications ===
The process is applicable for electrically conductive magnetic materials such as steel.

Long work pieces such as axles can be processed.

== See also ==
- Case hardening
- Induction forging
- Induction heater
- Induction shrink fitting
