= Induction forging =

Induction forging refers to the use of an induction heater to pre-heat metals prior to deformation using a press or hammer. Typically metals are heated to between 1,100 and 1,200 °C (2,010 and 2,190 °F) to increase their malleability and aid flow in the forging die.

== Process ==
Induction heating is a non-contact process which uses the principle of electromagnetic induction to produce heat in a workpiece. By placing a conductive material into a strong alternating magnetic field, electric current is made to flow in the material, thereby causing Joule heating. In magnetic materials, further heat is generated below the Curie point due to hysteresis losses. The generated current is predominantly in the surface layer, the depth of this layer being dictated by the frequency of the alternating field and the permeability of the material.

=== Power consumption ===
Power supplies for induction forging vary in power from a few kilowatts to many megawatts and, depending on the component geometry, can vary in frequency from 50 Hz to 200 kHz. The majority of applications use the range between 1 kHz and 100 kHz.

In order to select the correct power it is necessary to first calculate the thermal energy required to raise the material to the required temperature in the time allotted. This can be done using the heat content of the material, which is normally expressed in KW hours per tonne, the weight of metal to be processed and the time cycle. Once this has been established other factors such as radiated losses from the component, coil losses and other system losses need to be factored in. Traditionally this process involved lengthy and complex calculations in conjunction with a mixture of practical experience and empirical formula. Modern techniques utilise finite element analysis and other computer aided modeling techniques, however as with all such methods a thorough working knowledge of the induction heating process is still required.

=== Output frequency ===
The second major parameter to be considered is the output frequency of the power source. As the heat is predominantly generated in the surface of the component it is important to select a frequency which offers the deepest practical penetration depth into the material without running the risk of current cancellation. It will be appreciated that as only the skin is being heated time will be required for the heat to penetrate to the centre of the component and that if too much power is applied too quickly it is possible to melt the surface of the component whilst leaving the core cool. Utilising thermal conductivity data for the material and the customer's specified homogeneity (physics) requirements regarding the cross sectional ∆T it is possible to calculate or create a model to establish the heat time required. In many cases the time to achieve an acceptable ∆T will exceed what can be achieved by heating the components one at a time. A range of handling solutions including conveyors, in line feeders, pusher systems and walking beam feeders are utilised to facilitate the heating of multiple components whilst delivering single components to the operator at the required time cycle.

=== Advantages ===
- Process controllability – Unlike a traditional gas furnace the induction system requires no pre-heat cycle or controlled shutdown. The heat is available on demand. In addition to the benefits of rapid availability in the event of a downstream interruption to production the power can be switched off thus saving energy and reducing scaling on the components.
- Energy efficiency – Due to the heat being generated within the component energy transfer is extremely efficient. The induction heater heats only the part, not the atmosphere around it.
- Rapid temperature rise – High power densities ensure that the component reaches temperature extremely rapidly. Scale is reduced as are surface defects and undesirable effects on the surface metallurgy.
- Process consistency – The induction heating process produces extremely uniform consistent heat. This improves accuracy of the forging and can in extreme cases reduce post forging machining allowances and have a positive effect on die life.
- No harmful byproducts – Induction heating does not generate any environmental waste products and is a clean process as opposed to more traditional heating methods that generate smoke and toxic emissions.

=== Types ===
==== Bar end heating ====
Bar end heating is typically used where only a portion of the bar is to be forged. Typical applications of bar end heating are:

- Hot heading of bolts
- Anti roll bars
- Mining tools

Subject to the required throughput, handling systems can vary from simple two- or three-station pneumatic pusher systems to walking beams and conveyors.

==== Billet heating ====
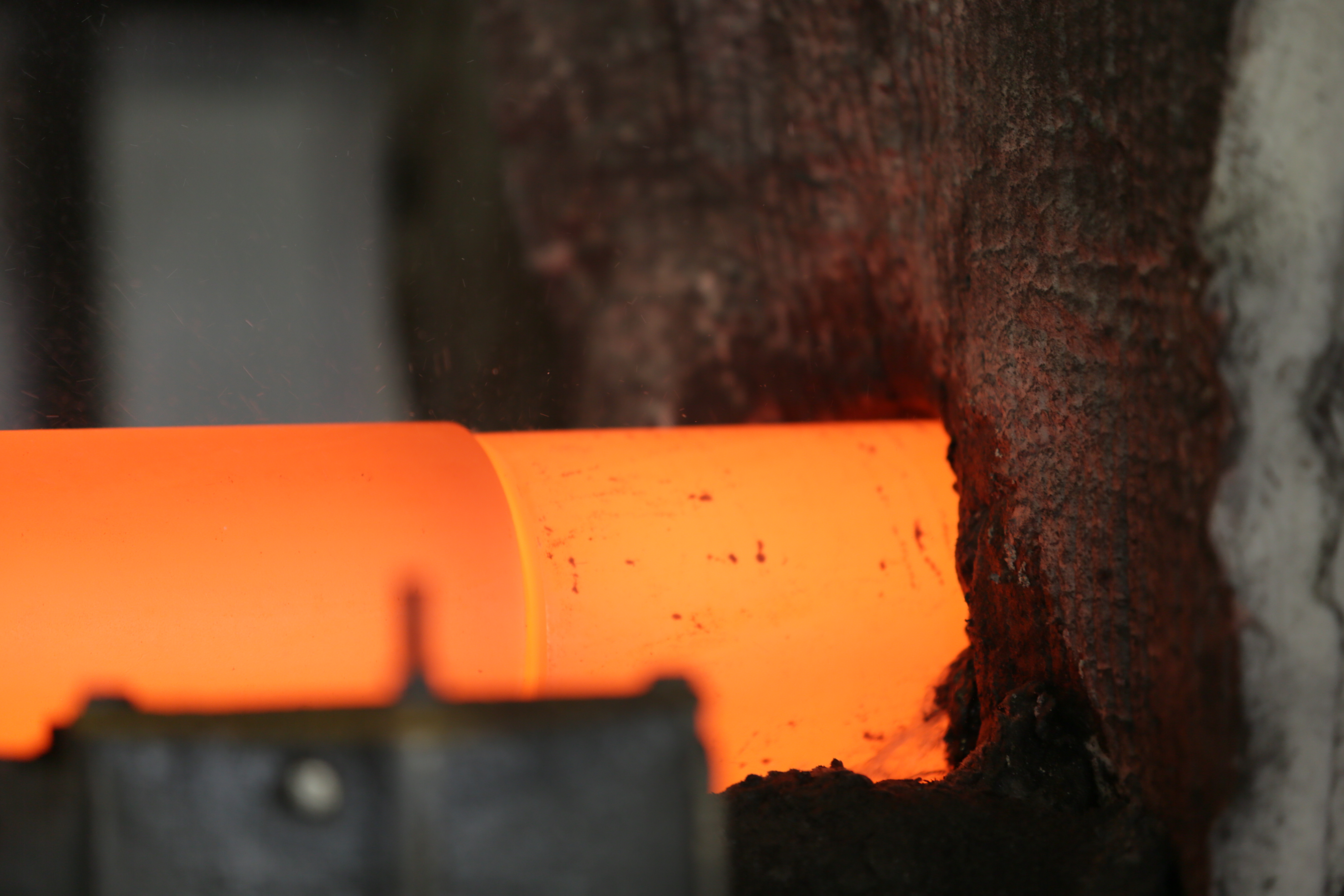
Billet heating

In the induction billet heater the whole of the billet or slug is heated. Normally for short billets or slugs a hopper or bowl is used to automatically present the billets in line to pinch rollers, chain driven tractor units or in some cases pneumatic pushers. The billets are then driven through the coil one behind the other on water cooled rails or ceramic liners are used through the coil bore which reduce friction and prevent wear. The length of the coil is a function of the required soak time, the cycle time per component and the length of the billet. In high volume large cross section work it is not unusual to have 4 or 5 coils in series to give 5 m (16 ft) of coil or more.

Typical parts processed by in line billet heating:

- Small crankshafts
- Camshafts
- Pneumatic and hydraulic fittings
- Hammer heads
- Engine valves

==== Single shot ====
For long billets, single shot heating can be used. This process utilises similar systems to bar end heating except that the whole of the billet is driven into individual coils. As with bar end heating the number of coils is governed by ∆T required and the thermal properties of the material being heated.

Typical parts processed by single shot billet heating:

- Lorry axles
- Marine camshafts

== See also ==
- Forging
- Induction hardening
- Induction shrink fitting
- Induction heater
