= Drum heater =

A drum heater – also called band heater, barrel heater, container heater or canister heater- is used to reduce viscosity of liquids and gels by heating in order to fill, pump or bottle the respective liquid or to prevent liquids from freezing inside the drum. Typical liquids for the bottling application are tar, varnish, resin, grease, chocolate or galantine. Drum heaters are available for drums between 20 and 220 litres.

== Drum heating ovens ==
Drum ovens are designed to store and heat typically from four to 24 drums, usually stored in groups of four on pallets, for ease of insertion and removal by fork-lift. Heated by steam or radiant electric elements, with a single zone thermostat, they are commonly used where long-term storage at a fixed temperature is required to reduce liquid viscosity or keep solids above their melt temperature. Mobile single-drum electric ovens are also available.

=== Glass fibre mats ===
Industrial heaters of this type have an isolated heating element embedded in a glass fibre mat. Silicone coated drum heaters are suitable for steel drums, whereas polyester coatings at lower temperatures can be used for plastic containers. As these heaters are flexible and wrap around the container they may also be called band heaters. Up to three band heaters can be applied to a standard 200 litre barrel. There is no additional insulation so heat is lost by radiation into the surrounding air and the surface temperatures can be hot enough to burn unprotected hands.

=== Insulated heating jackets ===
These electrical drum heaters have an outer layer of insulation to protect the user and to increase energy efficiency as significantly less heat is lost to the atmosphere, and thus their power consumption is considerably less than band heaters. Typically they are designed to cover the entire surface of the drum or container.

=== Drum base heater ===
Many viscous liquids and solids stored in steel drums require considerable energy input prior to removing from the container for processing. It is sometimes beneficial to add heat directly to the underside of the drum, using a base heater. These are available in various constructions using, induction heating, steam, or silicone heater mats inside a body with sufficient mechanical strength to support the weight of a full drum.

=== Induction Drum Heater ===
Individual steel drums can be heated by mains frequency induction heating. The magnetic field generated by the induction heater produces eddy currents in the drum wall, causing the steel to heat the contents.
