= Encode =

Encode or encoding may refer to:

- Encoding, or code

== Biology ==
- Coding region of a gene
- ENCODE (Encyclopedia of DNA Elements)

== Computer science ==
- APL (programming language) dyadic Encode function and its symbol ⊤
- Binary encoding
- Binary-to-text encoding
- Character encoding
- Encoding (memory)
- MPEG encoding
- Semantics encoding
- Text encoding — see character encoding applied to textual data
- Video encoding

== Semiotics ==
- Encoding (semiotics)

== See also ==
- Encoder (disambiguation)
- ENCOD, the European Coalition for Just and Effective Drug Policies
