= Induction heater =

Equipment used in induction heating

An induction heater is a key piece of equipment used in all forms of induction heating. Typically an induction heater operates at either medium frequency (MF) or radio frequency (RF) ranges.

Four main component systems form the basis of a modern induction heater

- the control system, control panel, or ON / OFF switch; in some cases this system can be absent
- the power unit (power inverter)
- the work head (transformer)
- and the heating coil (inductor)

== How it works ==
Induction heating is a non contact method of heating a conductive body by utilising a strong magnetic field. Supply (mains) frequency 50 Hz or 60 Hz induction heaters incorporate a coil directly fed from the electricity supply, typically for lower power industrial applications where lower surface temperatures are required. Some specialist induction heaters operate at 400 Hz, the Aerospace power frequency.

Induction heating should not be confused with induction cooking, as the two heating systems are mostly very physically different from each other. Notably, induction heating systems work by applying an alternating magnetic field to a ferrous material to induce an alternating current in the material, so exciting the atoms in the material heating it up.

== Main equipment components ==
An induction heater typically consists of three elements.

=== Power unit ===
Often referred to as the inverter or generator. This part of the system is used to take the mains frequency and increase it to anywhere between 10 Hz and 400 kHz. Typical output power of a unit system is from 2 kW to 500 kW.

=== Work head ===
This contains a combination of capacitors and transformers and is used to mate the power unit to the work coil.

=== Work coil ===
Also known as the inductor, the coil is used to transfer the energy from the power unit and work head to the work piece. Inductors range in complexity from a simple wound solenoid consisting of a number of turns of copper tube wound around a mandrel, to a precision item machined from solid copper, brazed and soldered together. As the inductor is the area where the heating takes place, coil design is one of the most important elements of the system and is a science in itself.

== Definitions ==
Radio frequency (RF) induction generators work in the frequency range from 100 kHz up to 10 MHz. Most induction heating devices (with induction frequency control) have a frequency range of 100 kHz to 200 kHz. The output range typically incorporates 2.5 kW to 40 kW. Induction heaters in this range are used for smaller components and applications such as induction hardening an engine valve.

MF induction generators work from 1 kHz to 10 kHz. The output range typically incorporates 50 kW to 500 kW. Induction heaters within these ranges are used on medium to larger components and applications such as the induction forging of a shaft.

Mains (or supply) frequency induction coils are driven directly from the standard AC supply. Most mains-frequency induction coils are designed for single-phase operation, and are low-current devices intended for localised heating, or low-temperature surface area heating, such as in a drum heater.

== History ==
The basic principle involved in induction heating was discovered by Michael Faraday as early as 1831. Faraday's work involved the use of a switched DC supply provided by a battery and two windings of copper wire wrapped around an iron core. It was noted that when the switch was closed a momentary current flowed in the secondary winding, which could be measured by means of a galvanometer. If the circuit remained energised then the current ceased to flow. On opening the switch a current again flowed in the secondary winding, but in the opposite direction. Faraday concluded that since no physical link existed between the two windings, the current in the secondary coil must be caused by a voltage that was induced from the first coil, and that the current produced was directly proportional to the rate of change of the magnetic flux.

Initially the principles were put to use in the design of transformers, motors and generators where undesirable heating effects were controlled by the use of a laminated core.

Early in the 20th century engineers started to look for ways to harness the heat-generating properties of induction for the purpose of melting steel. This early work used motor generators to create the medium frequency (MF) current, but the lack of suitable alternators and capacitors of the correct size held back early attempts. However, by 1927 the first MF induction melting system had been installed by EFCO in Sheffield, England.

At around the same time engineers at Midvale Steel and The Ohio Crankshaft Company in America were attempting to use the surface-heating effect of the MF current to produce localised surface case hardening in crankshafts. Much of this work took place at the frequencies of 1920 and 3000 Hz as these were the easiest frequencies to produce with the equipment available. As with many technology-based fields it was the advent of World War II which led to huge developments in the utilisation of induction heating in the production of vehicle parts and munitions.

Over time, the technology advanced and units in the 3 to 10 kHz frequency range with powers outputs to 600 kW became common place in induction forging and large induction hardening applications. The motor generator would remain the mainstay of MF power generation until the advent of high-voltage semiconductors in the late 1960s and early 1970s.

Early in the evolutionary process it became obvious to engineers that the ability to produce a higher radio frequency range of equipment would result in greater flexibility and open up a whole range of alternative applications. Methods were sought to produce these higher RF power supplies to operate in the 200 to 400 kHz range.

Development in this particular frequency range has always mirrored that of the radio transmitter and television broadcasting industry and indeed has often used component parts developed for this purpose. Early units utilised spark gap technology, but due to limitations the approach was rapidly superseded by the use of multi-electrode thermionic triode (valve) based oscillators. Indeed, many of the pioneers in the industry were also very involved in the radio and telecommunications industry and companies such as Philips, English Electric and Redifon were all involved in manufacturing induction heating equipment in the 1950s and 1960s.

The use of this technology survived until the early 1990s at which point the technology was all but replaced by power MOSFET and IGBT solid-state equipment. However, there are still many valve oscillators still in existence, and at extreme frequencies of 5 MHz and above they are often the only viable approach and are still produced.

Mains frequency induction heaters are still widely used throughout manufacturing industry due to their relatively low cost and thermal efficiency compared to radiant heating where piece parts or steel containers need to be heated as part of a batch process line.

== Valve oscillator based power supply ==
Due to its flexibility and potential frequency range, the valve oscillator based induction heater was until recent years widely used throughout industry. Readily available in powers from 1 kW to 1 MW and in a frequency range from 100 kHz to many MHz, this type of unit found widespread use in thousands of applications including soldering and brazing, induction hardening, tube welding and induction shrink fitting. The unit consists of three basic elements:

=== High-voltage DC power supply ===
The DC (direct current) power supply consists of a standard air or water cooled step-up transformer and a high-voltage rectifier unit capable of generating voltages typically between 5 and 10 kV to power the oscillator. The unit needs to be rated at the correct kilovolt-ampere (kVA) to supply the necessary current to the oscillator. Early rectifier systems featured valve rectifiers such as GXU4 (high-power high-voltage half-wave rectifier) but these were ultimately superseded by high-voltage solid-state rectifiers.

=== Self exciting class 'C' oscillator ===
The oscillator circuit is responsible for creating the elevated frequency electric current, which when applied to the work coil creates the magnetic field which heats the part. The basic elements of the circuit are an inductance (tank coil) and a capacitance (tank capacitor) and an oscillator valve. Basic electrical principles dictate that if a voltage is applied to a circuit containing a capacitor and inductor the circuit will oscillate in much the same way as a swing which has been pushed. Using our swing as an analogy if we do not push again at the right time the swing will gradually stop this is the same with the oscillator. The purpose of the valve is to act as a switch which will allow energy to pass into the oscillator at the correct time to maintain the oscillations. In order to time the switching, a small amount of energy is fed back to the grid of the triode effectively blocking or firing the device or allow it to conduct at the correct time. This so-called grid bias can be derived, either capacitively, conductively or inductively depending on whether the oscillator is a Colpitts, Hartley oscillator, Armstrong tickler or a Meissner.

=== Means of power control ===
Power control for the system can be achieved by a variety of methods. Many latter day units feature thyristor power control which works by means of a full-wave AC (alternating current) drive varying the primary voltage to the input transformer. More traditional methods include three-phase variacs (autotransformer) or motorised Brentford type voltage regulators to control the input voltage. Another very popular method was to use a two part tank coil with a primary and secondary winding separated by an air gap. Power control was affected by varying the magnetic coupling of the two coils by physically moving them relative to each other.

== Solid-state power supplies ==
In the early days of induction heating, the motor–generator was used extensively for the production of MF power up to 10 kHz. While it is possible to generate multiples of the supply frequency such as 150 Hz using a standard induction motor driving an AC generator, there are limitations. This type of generator featured rotor mounted windings which limited the peripheral speed of the rotor due to the centrifugal forces on these windings. This had the effect of limiting the diameter of the machine and therefore its power and the number of poles which can be physically accommodated, which in turn limits the maximum operating frequency.

To overcome these limitations the induction heating industry turned to the induction generator. This type of machine features a toothed rotor constructed from a stack of punched iron laminations. The excitation and AC windings are both mounted on the stator, the rotor is therefore a compact solid construction which can be rotated at higher peripheral speeds than the standard AC generator above thus allowing it to be greater in diameter for a given RPM. This larger diameter allows a greater number of poles to be accommodated and when combined with complex slotting arrangements such as the Lorenz gauge condition or Guy slotting which allows the generation of frequencies from 1 to 10 kHz.

As with all rotating electrical machines, high rotation speeds and small clearances are utilised to maximise flux variations. This necessitates that close attention is paid to the quality of bearings utilised and the stiffness and accuracy of rotor. Drive for the alternator is normally provided by a standard induction motor for convention and simplicity. Both vertical and horizontal configurations are utilised and in most cases the motor rotor and generator rotor are mounted on a common shaft with no coupling. The whole assembly is then mounted in a frame containing the motor stator and generator stator. The whole construction is mounted in a cubicle which features a heat exchanger and water cooling systems as required.

The motor–generator became the mainstay of medium frequency power generation until the advent of solid-state technology in the early 1970s.

In the early 1970s the advent of solid-state switching technology saw a shift from the traditional methods of induction heating power generation. Initially this was limited to the use of thyristors for generating the 'MF range of frequencies using discrete electronic control systems.

State of the art units now employ SCR (silicon-controlled rectifier), IGBT or MOSFET technologies for generating the 'MF' and 'RF' current. The modern control system is typically a digital microprocessor based system utilising PIC, PLC (programmable logic controller) technology and surface mount manufacturing techniques for production of the printed circuit boards. Solid state now dominates the market and units from 1 kW to many megawatts in frequencies from 1 kHz to 3 MHz including dual frequency units are now available.

A whole range of techniques are employed in the generation of MF and RF power using semiconductors, the actual technique employed depends often on a complex range of factors. The typical generator will employ either a current or a voltage fed topology. The actual approach employed will be a function of the required power, frequency, individual application, the initial cost and subsequent running costs. Irrespective of the approach employed however, all units tend to feature four distinct elements:

=== AC to DC rectifier ===
This takes the mains supply voltage and converts it from the supply frequency of 50 or 60 Hz and also converts it to 'DC'. This can supply a variable DC voltage, a fixed DC voltage or a variable DC current. In the case of a variable systems, they are used to provide overall power control for the system. Fixed voltage rectifiers need to be used in conjunction with an alternative means of power control. This can be done by utilising a switch mode regulator or a by using a variety of control methods within the inverter section.

=== DC to AC inverter ===
The inverter converts the DC supply to a single-phase AC output at the relevant frequency. This features the SCR, IGBT or MOSFETS and in most cases is configured as an H-bridge. The H-bridge has four legs each with a switch, the output circuit is connected across the centre of the devices. When the relevant two switches are closed current flows through the load in one direction, these switches then open and the opposing two switches close allowing current to flow in the opposite direction. By precisely timing the opening and closing of the switches, it is possible to sustain oscillations in the load circuit.

=== Output circuit ===
The output circuit has the job of matching the output of the inverter to that required by the coil. This can in it simplest form be a capacitor or in some cases will feature a combination of capacitors and transformers.

=== Control system ===
The control section monitors all the parameters in the load circuit, the inverter and supplies switching pulses at the appropriate time to supply energy to the output circuit. Early systems featured discrete electronics with variable potentiometers to adjust switching times, current limits, voltage limits and frequency trips. However, with the advent of microcontroller technology, the majority of advanced systems now feature digital control.

== The voltage-fed inverter ==
The voltage-fed inverter features a filter capacitor on the input to the inverter and a series resonant output circuits. The voltage-fed system is extremely popular and can be used with either SCRs up to frequencies of 10 kHz, IGBTs to 100 kHz and MOSFETs up to 3 MHz. A voltage-fed inverter with a series connection to a parallel load is also known as a third order system. Basically this is similar to solid state, but in this system the series connected internal capacitor and inductor are connected to a parallel output tank circuit. The principal advantage of this type of system is the robustness of the inverter due to the internal circuit effectively isolating the output circuit making the switching components less susceptible to damage due to coil flash-overs or mismatching.

== The current-fed inverter ==
The current-fed inverter is different from the voltage-fed system in that it utilises a variable DC input followed by a large inductor at the input to the inverter bridge. The power circuit features a parallel resonant circuit and can have operating frequencies typically from 1 kHz to 1 MHz. As with the voltage-fed system, SCRs are typically used up to 10 kHz with IGBTs and MOSFETs being used at the higher frequencies.

== Suitable materials ==
Suitable materials are those with high permeability (100–500) which are heated below the Curie temperature of that material.

== See also ==
- Induction forging
- Induction shrink fitting
- Induction hardening
- Induction heating
- Drum heater
