= Információs Hivatal =

Hungarian governmental Intelligence agency

Information Office
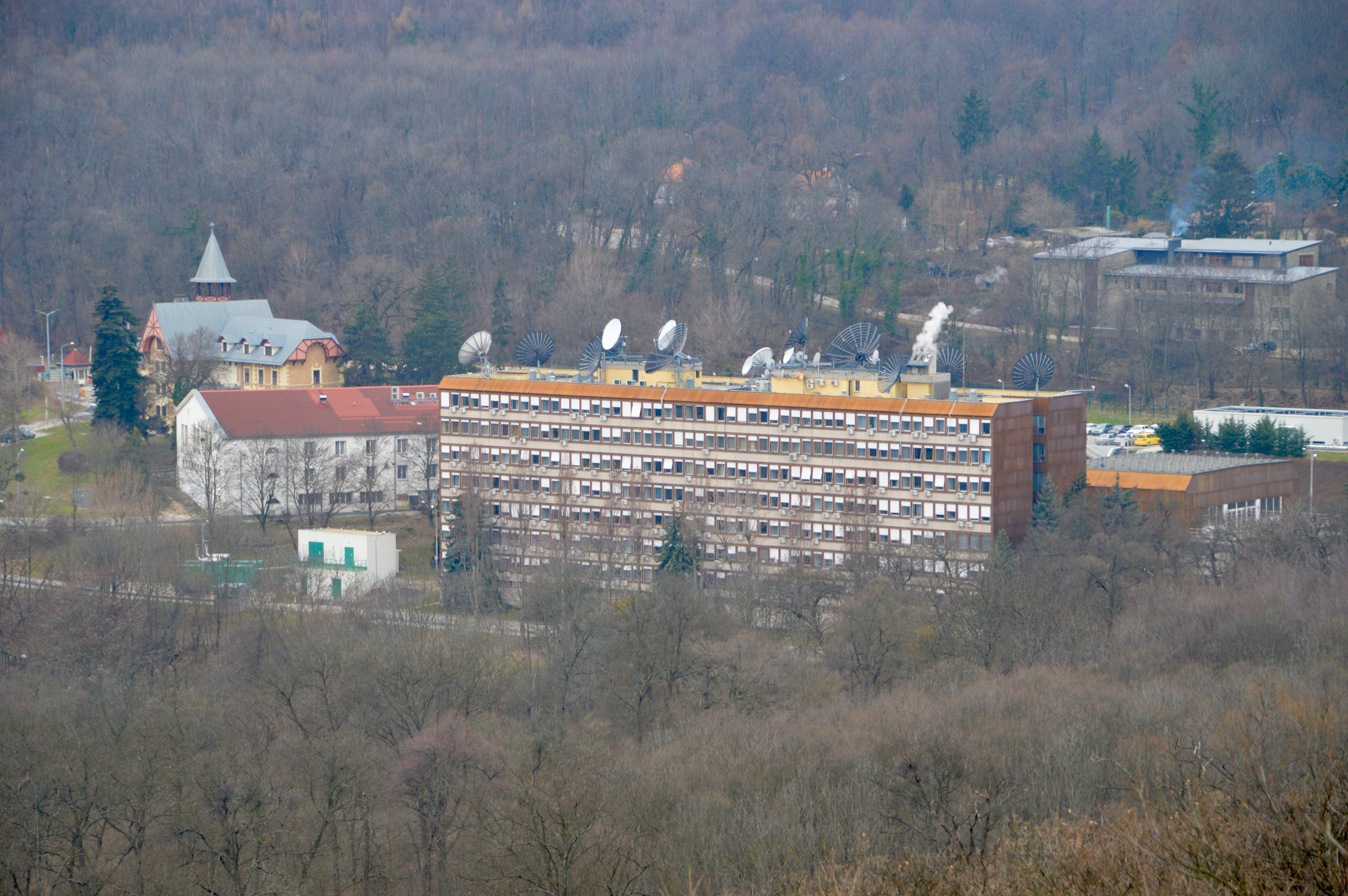

Agency overview
- Formed: March 1, 1990; 36 years ago
- Type: Intelligence agency
- Headquarters: 1539 Budapest, Hungary
- Motto: Homeland before all Homeland over everything
- Employees: ~800 (estimate)
- Agency executive: dr. Krisztián Oláh, Director general
- Parent department: Ministry of Foreign Affairs
- Website: ih.gov.hu

Information Office (Hungarian: Információs Hivatal [ˈiɱformaːt͡sijoːʃ ˈhivɒtɒl]) is a civilian foreign intelligence service of Hungary, officially tasked with gathering and analyzing national security information from primarily abroad.

Based on the Act on National Security Services, the Information Office continuously acquires, analyzes, evaluates and forwards information required for government decisions, related to foreign countries or of foreign origin, that can be used for the sake of the nation's security, which it makes available to the government at regular intervals. Furthermore, taking an active role in intelligence cooperation in the fight against terrorism, the Information Office monitors connections between states and terrorist organizations, relations between intelligence services and terrorist organizations, extreme political-religious groups, and new methods used by terrorist organizations and efforts to produce chemical weapons in order to inform state decision-makers.

It was alleged in 2025 that the Information Office had established a spy network in European Union institutions in Brussels. The investigation leading to the allegation was conducted by De Tijd; Direkt36, a not-for-profit investigative journalism centre in Hungary; Paper Trail Media, a German collective; Der Spiegel and Der Standard.
