= Encoder (position) =

An encoder is a sensor which turns a position into an electronic signal.

There are two forms:

- Absolute encoders give an absolute position value.
- Incremental encoders count movement rather than position. With detection of a datum position and the use of a counter, an absolute position may be derived.

The position may be measured as either linear or angular position

- Linear encoder, converts linear position to an electronic signal
- Rotary encoder, converts rotary position to an electronic signal

== See also ==
- Encoder (disambiguation)
