= Encoder =

Encoder may refer to:

== Electronic circuits ==
- Audio encoder, converts digital audio to analog audio signals
- Video encoder, converts digital video to analog video signals
- Simple encoder, assigns a binary code to an active input line
- Priority encoder, outputs a binary code representing the highest-priority active input
- 8b/10b encoder, creates DC balance on a communication transmission line

== Media compression ==
- Compressor, encodes data (e.g., audio/video/images) into a smaller form (see codec)

== Sensors ==
- Encoder (position)
  - Rotary encoder, converts rotary position to electronic signals
  - Linear encoder, converts linear position to electronic signals
  - Absolute encoder, outputs the absolute position
  - Incremental encoder, converts position changes to electronic signals in real time
- Altitude encoder

== See also ==
- Decoder (disambiguation)
- Encode (disambiguation)
