= Induction heating =

Process of heating an electrically conducting object by electromagnetic induction

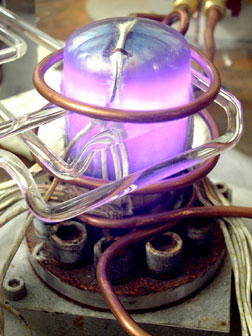
Component of Stirling radioisotope generator is heated by induction during testing

Induction heating is the process of heating electrically conductive materials, namely metals or semi-conductors, by electromagnetic induction, through heat transfer passing through an inductor that creates an electromagnetic field within the coil to heat up and possibly melt steel, copper, brass, graphite, gold, silver, aluminum, or carbide.

An important feature of the induction heating process is that the heat is generated inside the object itself, instead of by an external heat source via heat conduction. Thus objects can be heated very rapidly. In addition, there need not be any external contact, which can be important where contamination is an issue. Induction heating is used in many industrial processes, such as heat treatment in metallurgy, Czochralski crystal growth and zone refining used in the semiconductor industry, and to melt refractory metals that require very high temperatures. It is also used in induction cooktops.

An induction heater consists of an electromagnet and an electronic oscillator that passes a high-frequency alternating current (AC) through the electromagnet. The rapidly alternating magnetic field penetrates the object, generating electric currents inside the conductor called eddy currents. The eddy currents flow through the resistance of the material, and heat it by Joule heating. In ferromagnetic and ferrimagnetic materials, such as iron, heat is also generated by magnetic hysteresis losses. The frequency of the electric current used for induction heating depends on the object size, material type, coupling (between the work coil and the object to be heated), and the penetration depth.

== Applications ==
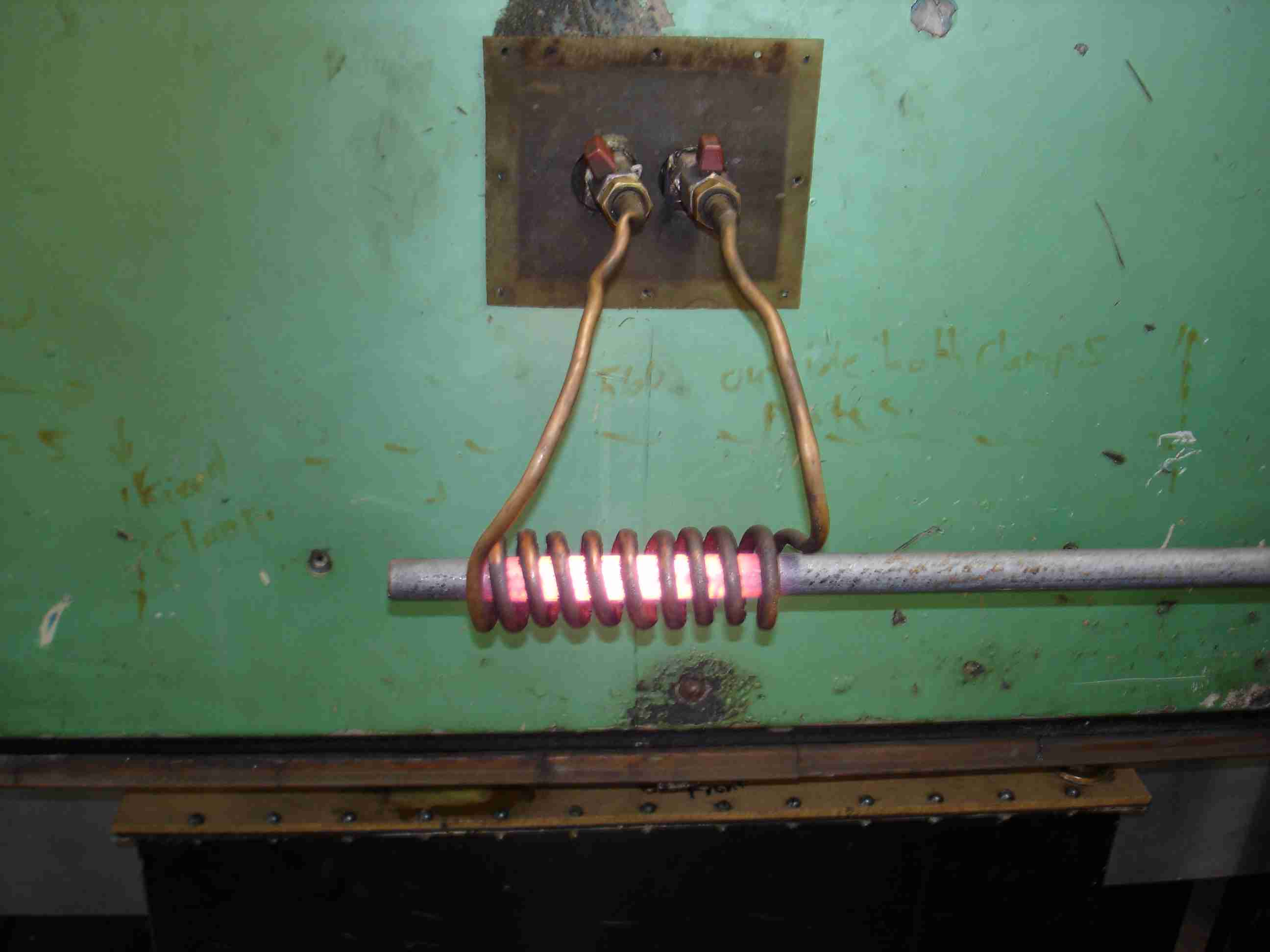
Induction heating of 25 mm metal bar using 15 kW at 450 kHz.

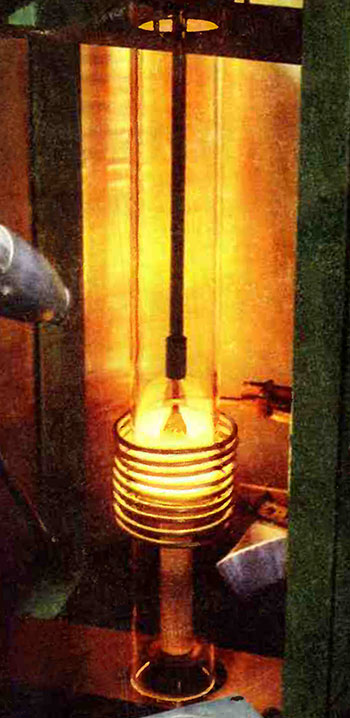
Keeping silicon in crucible molten at 2,650 °F (1,450 °C) for Czochralski crystal growth, 1956.

Induction heating allows the targeted heating of an applicable item for applications including surface hardening, melting, brazing and soldering, and heating to fit. Due to their ferromagnetic nature, iron and its alloys respond best to induction heating. Eddy currents can, however, be generated in any conductor, and magnetic hysteresis can occur in any magnetic material. Induction heating has been used to heat liquid conductors (such as molten metals) and also gaseous conductors (such as a gas plasma—see Induction plasma technology). Induction heating is often used to heat graphite crucibles (containing other materials) and is used extensively in the semiconductor industry for the heating of silicon and other semiconductors. Utility frequency (50/60 Hz) induction heating is used for many lower-cost industrial applications as inverters are not required.

=== Furnace ===
An induction furnace uses induction to heat metal to its melting point. Once molten, the high-frequency magnetic field can also be used to stir the hot metal, which is useful in ensuring that alloying additions are fully mixed into the melt. Most induction furnaces consist of a tube of water-cooled copper rings surrounding a container of refractory material. Induction furnaces are used in most modern foundries as a cleaner method of melting metals than a reverberatory furnace or a cupola. Sizes range from a kilogram of capacity to a hundred tonnes. Induction furnaces often emit a high-pitched whine or hum when they are running, depending on their operating frequency. Metals melted include iron and steel, copper, aluminium, and precious metals. Because it is a clean and non-contact process, it can be used in a vacuum or inert atmosphere. Vacuum furnaces use induction heating to produce specialty steels and other alloys that would oxidize if heated in the presence of air.

=== Welding ===
A similar, smaller-scale process is used for induction welding. Plastics may also be welded by induction, if they are either doped with ferromagnetic ceramics (where magnetic hysteresis of the particles provides the heat required) or by metallic particles.

Seams of tubes can be welded this way. Currents induced in a tube run along the open seam and heat the edges resulting in a temperature high enough for welding. At this point, the seam edges are forced together and the seam is welded. The RF current can also be conveyed to the tube by brushes, but the result is still the same—the current flows along the open seam, heating it.

=== Manufacturing ===
In the Rapid Induction Printing metal additive printing process, a conductive wire feedstock and shielding gas is fed through a coiled nozzle, subjecting the feedstock to induction heating and ejection from the nozzle as a liquid, in order to refuse under shielding to form three-dimensional metal structures. The core benefit of the use of induction heating in this process is significantly greater energy and material efficiency as well as a higher degree of safety when compared with other additive manufacturing methods, such as selective laser sintering, which deliver heat to the material using a powerful laser or electron beam.

=== Cooking ===
In induction cooking, an induction coil inside the cooktop heats the iron base of cookware by magnetic induction. Using induction cookers produces safety, efficiency (the induction cooktop is not heated itself), and speed. Non-ferrous pans such as copper-bottomed pans and aluminium pans are generally unsuitable. By thermal conduction, the heat induced in the base is transferred to the food inside.

=== Brazing ===
Induction brazing is often used in higher production runs. It produces uniform results and is very repeatable. There are many types of industrial equipment where induction brazing is used. For instance, Induction is used for brazing carbide to a shaft.

=== Sealing ===
Induction heating is used in cap sealing of containers in the food and pharmaceutical industries. A layer of aluminum foil is placed over the bottle or jar opening and heated by induction to fuse it to the container. This provides a tamper-resistant seal since altering the contents requires breaking the foil.

=== Heating to fit ===
Induction heating is often used to heat an item causing it to expand before fitting or assembly. Bearings are routinely heated in this way using utility frequency (50/60 Hz) and a laminated steel transformer-type core passing through the centre of the bearing.

=== Heat treatment ===
Induction heating is often used in the heat treatment of metal items. The most common applications are induction hardening of steel parts, induction soldering/brazing as a means of joining metal components, and induction annealing to selectively soften an area of a steel part.

Induction heating can produce high-power densities which allow short interaction times to reach the required temperature. This gives tight control of the heating pattern with the pattern following the applied magnetic field quite closely and allows reduced thermal distortion and damage.

This ability can be used in hardening to produce parts with varying properties. The most common hardening process is to produce a localised surface hardening of an area that needs wear resistance while retaining the toughness of the original structure as needed elsewhere. The depth of induction hardened patterns can be controlled through the choice of induction frequency, power density, and interaction time.

Limits to the flexibility of the process arise from the need to produce dedicated inductors for many applications. This is quite expensive and requires the marshalling of high-current densities in small copper inductors, which can require specialized engineering and "copper-fitting".

=== Plastic processing ===
Induction heating is used in plastic injection molding machines. Induction heating improves energy efficiency for injection and extrusion processes. Heat is directly generated in the barrel of the machine, reducing warm-up time and energy consumption. The induction coil can be placed outside thermal insulation, so it operates at low temperatures and has a long life. The frequency used ranges from 30 kHz down to 5 kHz, decreasing for thicker barrels. The reduction in the cost of inverter equipment has made induction heating increasingly popular. Induction heating can also be applied to molds, offering more even mold temperature and improved product quality.

=== Pyrolysis ===
Induction heating is used to obtain biochar in the pyrolysis of biomass. Heat is directly generated into shaker reactor walls, enabling the pyrolysis of the biomass with good mixing and temperature control.

=== Bolt heating ===
Induction heating is used by mechanics to remove rusted bolts. The heat helps remove the rust induced tension between the threads.

== Details ==
The basic setup is an AC power supply that provides electricity with low voltage but very high current and high frequency. The workpiece to heat is placed inside an air coil driven by the power supply, usually in combination with a resonant tank capacitor to increase the reactive power. The alternating magnetic field induces eddy currents in the workpiece.

The frequency of the inductive current determines the depth that the induced eddy currents penetrate the workpiece. In the simplest case of a solid round bar, the induced current decreases exponentially from the surface. The penetration depth $\delta$ in which 86% of power will be concentrated, can be derived as $\delta = 503 \sqrt{\frac{\rho}{\mu f}}$, where $\delta$ is the depth in meters, $\rho$ is the resistivity of the workpiece in ohm-meters, $\mu$ is the dimensionless relative magnetic permeability of the workpiece, and $f$ is the frequency of the AC field in Hz. The AC field can be calculated using the formula ${\frac{1}{T}}$. The equivalent resistance of the workpiece and thus the efficiency is a function of the workpiece diameter $a$ over the reference depth $d$, increasing rapidly up to about $a/d=4$. Since the workpiece diameter is fixed by the application, the value of $a/d$ is determined by the reference depth. Decreasing the reference depth requires increasing the frequency. Since the cost of induction power supplies increases with frequency, supplies are often optimized to achieve a critical frequency at which $a/d=4$. If operated below the critical frequency, heating efficiency is reduced because eddy currents from either side of the workpiece impinge upon one another and cancel out. Increasing the frequency beyond the critical frequency creates minimal further improvement in heating efficiency, although it is used in applications that seek to heat treat only the surface of the workpiece.

Relative depth varies with temperature because resistivities and permeability vary with temperature. For steel, the relative permeability drops to 1 above the Curie temperature. Thus the reference depth can vary with temperature by a factor of 2–3 for nonmagnetic conductors and by as much as 20 for magnetic steels.

Applications of frequency ranges
Frequency (kHz)	Workpiece type
5–30	Thick materials (e.g. steel at 815 °C with diameter 50 mm or greater).
100–400	Small workpieces or shallow penetration (e.g. steel at 815 °C with diameter of 5–10 mm or steel at 25 °C with a diameter around 0.1 mm).
480	Microscopic pieces

Magnetic materials improve the induction heat process because of hysteresis. Materials with high permeability (100–500) are easier to heat with induction heating. Hysteresis heating occurs below the Curie temperature, where materials retain their magnetic properties. High permeability below the Curie temperature in the workpiece is useful. Temperature difference, mass, and specific heat influence the workpiece heating.

The energy transfer of induction heating is affected by the distance between the coil and the workpiece. Energy losses occur through heat conduction from workpiece to fixture, natural convection, and thermal radiation.

The induction coil is usually made of copper tubing and fluid coolant. Diameter, shape, and number of turns influence the efficiency and field pattern.

== Core type furnace ==
The furnace consists of a circular hearth that contains the charge to be melted in the form of a ring. The metal ring is large in diameter and is magnetically interlinked with an electrical winding energized by an AC source. It is essentially a transformer where the charge to be heated forms a single-turn short circuit secondary and is magnetically coupled to the primary by an iron core.

== See also ==
- Dielectric heating
- Induction cooking
