= RC time constant =

Time constant of an RC circuit

- $\tau = R \cdot C$
- Symbol: $\tau$ (tau)
- SI unit: second (s)
- Dimension: time ($\mathsf{T}$)

Variables
$R$	Resistance	ohms (Ω)
$C$	Capacitance	farads (F)

Thresholds
time	charging	discharging
1$\tau$	63.2%	36.8%
2$\tau$	86.5%	13.5%
3$\tau$	95.0%	5.0%
4$\tau$	98.2%	1.8%
5$\tau$	99.3%	0.7%

Applications

RC circuit, Low-pass filter, High-pass filter, electronic timing, debouncing

The RC time constant, denoted τ (lowercase tau), the time constant of a resistor–capacitor circuit (RC circuit), is equal to the product of the circuit resistance and the circuit capacitance:

$$\tau = RC \, .$$

When the capacitance C in this series RC circuit is charged or discharged through the resistance R, the capacitor's voltage V_{C} is an exponentially-decaying function of time scaled by the RC time constant.

It is the time required to charge the capacitor, through the resistor, from an initial charge voltage of zero to approximately 63.2% of the value of an applied DC voltage, or to discharge the capacitor through the same resistor to approximately 36.8% of its initial charge voltage. These percents are derived from e, the base of natural logarithms, where $63.2\% \approx 1{-}e^{-1}$ and $36.8\% \approx e^{-1}$. When using the International System of Units, R is in ohms, C is in farads, and τ is in seconds.

Discharging a capacitor through a series resistor to zero volts from an initial voltage of V_{0} results in the capacitor having the following exponentially-decaying voltage curve:

$$V_\text{C}(t) = V_0 \cdot (e^{-t/ \tau})$$

Charging an uncharged capacitor through a series resistor to an applied constant input voltage V_{0} results in the capacitor having the following voltage curve over time:

$$V_\text{C}(t) = V_0 \cdot (1-e^{-t/ \tau})$$

which is a vertical mirror image of the charging curve.

Percentages at time $t$ of 1τ, 2τ, 3τ, 4τ, and 5τ listed in the "Thresholds" table are useful to remember. At 5τ the voltage is at 99.3% (if charging) or 0.7% (if discharging), and so is generally considered to have reached its final steady state, even though in theory the voltage asymptotically approaches yet never actually reaches its final voltage.

== Cutoff frequency ==
The time constant $\tau$ is related to the RC circuit's cutoff frequency f_{c}, by

$$\tau = RC = \frac{1}{2 \pi f_c} \approx \frac{0.159}{f_c},$$

or, equivalently,

$$f_c = \frac{1}{2 \pi R C} = \frac{1}{2 \pi \tau} \approx \frac{0.159}{\tau}.$$

Using resistance in ohms and capacitance in farads yields a time constant in seconds and cutoff frequency in hertz (Hz). The cutoff frequency when expressed as an angular frequency $( \omega_c {=} 2 \pi f_c )$ is simply the reciprocal of the time constant.

In more complicated circuits consisting of more than one resistor and/or capacitor, the open-circuit time constant method provides a way of approximating the cutoff frequency by computing a sum of several RC time constants.

A rise time that depends primarily on an RC circuit will be proportional to the time constant:

rise time (20% to 80%) $t_r \approx 1.4 \tau \approx \frac{0.22}{f_c}$
rise time (10% to 90%) $t_r \approx 2.2 \tau \approx \frac{0.35}{f_c}$

== Calculator ==
For instance, 1 of resistance with 1 of capacitance produces a time constant of approximately 1 seconds. This τ corresponds to a cutoff frequency of approximately 159 millihertz or 1 radians per second. If the capacitor has an initial voltage V_{0} of 1 , then after 1 τ (approximately 1 seconds or 1.443 half-lives), the capacitor's voltage will discharge to approximately 368 millivolts, or about 36.8% of V_{0}.

Any tangent line that intersects this voltage curve at any $t$ will hit the horizontal axis at a time $t {+} \tau$.

== Delay ==
The signal delay of a wire or other circuit, measured as group delay or phase delay or the effective propagation delay of a digital transition, may be dominated by resistive-capacitive effects, depending on the distance and other parameters, or may alternatively be dominated by inductive, wave, and speed of light effects in other realms.

Resistive-capacitive delay (RC delay) hinders microelectronic integrated circuit (IC) speed improvements. As semiconductor feature size becomes smaller and smaller to increase the clock rate, the RC delay plays an increasingly important role. This delay can be reduced by replacing the aluminum conducting wire by copper to reduce resistance or by changing the interlayer dielectric (typically silicon dioxide) to low-dielectric-constant materials to reduce capacitance.

The typical digital propagation delay of a resistive wire is about half of R times C; since both R and C are proportional to wire length, the delay scales as the square of wire length. Charge spreads by diffusion in such a wire, as explained by Lord Kelvin in the mid-nineteenth century. Until Heaviside discovered that Maxwell's equations imply wave propagation when sufficient inductance is in the circuit, this square diffusion relationship was thought to provide a fundamental limit to the improvement of long-distance telegraph cables. That old analysis was superseded in the telegraph domain, but remains relevant for long on-chip interconnects.

== See also ==
- Cutoff frequency and frequency response
- Emphasis, preemphasis, deemphasis
- Exponential decay
- Filter (signal processing) and transfer function
- High-pass filter, low-pass filter, band-pass filter
- RL circuit, and RLC circuit
- Rise time
