= Open-circuit time constant method =

The open-circuit time constant (OCT) method is an approximate analysis technique used in electronic circuit design to determine the corner frequency of complex circuits. It is a special case of zero-value time constant (ZVT) method technique when reactive elements consist of only capacitors. The zero-value time (ZVT) constant method itself is a special case of the general Time- and Transfer Constant (TTC) analysis that allows full evaluation of the zeros and poles of any lumped LTI systems of with both inductors and capacitors as reactive elements using time constants and transfer constants. The OCT method provides a quick evaluation, and identifies the largest contributions to time constants as a guide to the circuit improvements.

The basis of the method is the approximation that the corner frequency of the amplifier is determined by the term in the denominator of its transfer function that is linear in frequency. This approximation can be extremely inaccurate in some cases where a zero in the numerator is near in frequency. If all the poles are real and there are no zeros, this approximation is always conservative, in the sense that the inverse of the sum of the zero-value time constants is less than the actual corner frequency of the circuit.

The method also uses a simplified method for finding the term linear in frequency based upon summing the RC-products for each capacitor in the circuit, where the resistor R for a selected capacitor is the resistance found by inserting a test source at its site and setting all other capacitors to zero. Hence the name zero-value time constant technique.

== Example: Simple RC network ==
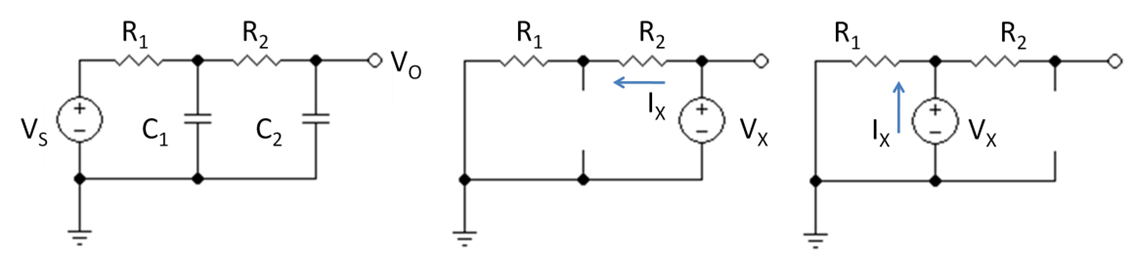
Figure 1: Simple RC circuit and auxiliary circuits to find time constants

Figure 1 shows a simple RC low-pass filter. Its transfer function is found using Kirchhoff's current law as follows. At the output,

$$\frac {V_1 - V_O } {R_2} = j\omega C_2 V_O \ ,$$

where V_{1} is the voltage at the top of capacitor C_{1}. At the center node:

$$\frac {V_S-V_1}{R_1} = j \omega C_1 V_1 + \frac {V_1-V_O} {R_2} \ .$$

Combining these relations the transfer function is found to be:

$$\frac {V_O} {V_S} = \frac {1} {1 + j \omega \left(C_2 (R_1+R_2) +C_1 R_1 \right) +(j \omega )^2 C_1 C_2 R_1 R_2 }$$

The linear term in jω in this transfer function can be derived by the following method, which is an application of the open-circuit time constant method to this example.

1. Set the signal source to zero.
2. Select capacitor C_{2}, replace it by a test voltage V_{X}, and replace C_{1} by an open circuit. Then the resistance seen by the test voltage is found using the circuit in the middle panel of Figure 1 and is simply V_{X} / I_{X} = R_{1} + R_{2}. Form the product C_{2} ( R_{1} + R_{2} ).
3. Select capacitor C_{1}, replace it by a test voltage V_{X}, and replace C_{2} by an open circuit. Then the resistance seen by the test voltage is found using the circuit in the right panel of Figure 1 and is simply V_{X} / I_{X} = R_{1}. Form the product C_{1} R_{1}.
4. Add these terms.

In effect, it is as though each capacitor charges and discharges through the resistance found in the circuit when the other capacitor is an open circuit.

The open circuit time constant procedure provides the linear term in jω regardless of how complex the RC network becomes. This was originally developed and proven by calculating the co-factors of the admittance matrix by Thornton and Searle. A more intuitive inductive proof of this (and other properties of TTC) was later developed by Hajimiri.

For a complex circuit, the procedure consists of following the above rules, going through all the capacitors in the circuit. A more general derivation is found in Gray and Meyer.

So far the result is general, but an approximation is introduced to make use of this result: the assumption is made that this linear term in jω determines the corner frequency of the circuit.

That assumption can be examined more closely using the example of Figure 1: suppose the time constants of this circuit are τ_{1} and τ_{2}; that is:

$$\left( 1 + j \omega { \tau}_1) (1 +j \omega {\tau}_2 \right) = 1 + j \omega \left(C_2 (R_1+R_2) +C_1 R_1 \right) +(j \omega )^2 C_1 C_2 R_1 R_2$$

Comparing the coefficients of the linear and quadratic terms in jω, there results:

$$\tau_1 + \tau_2 = C_2 (R_1+R_2) +C_1 R_1  \ ,$$
$$\tau_1 \tau_2 = C_1 C_2 R_1 R_2 \ .$$

One of the two time constants will be the longest; let it be τ_{1}. Suppose for the moment that it is much larger than the other, τ_{1} >> τ_{2}. In this case, the approximations hold that:

$$\tau_1 + \tau_2 \approx \tau_1 \ ,$$

and

$$\tau_2 = \frac {\tau_1 \tau_2 } { \tau_1} \approx \frac {\tau_1 \tau_2 } { \tau_1 + \tau_2 } \ .$$

In other words, substituting the RC-values:

$$\tau_1 \approx \hat { \tau_1} =\ \tau_1 + \tau_2  = C_2 (R_1+R_2) +C_1 R_1   \ ,$$

and

$$\tau_2 \approx \hat { \tau_2} =\frac {\tau_1 \tau_2 } { \tau_1 + \tau_2 } = \frac {C_1 C_2 R_1 R_2} {C_2 (R_1+R_2) +C_1 R_1} \ ,$$

where ( ^ ) denotes the approximate result. As an aside, notice that the circuit time constants both involve both capacitors; in other words, in general the circuit time constants are not decided by any single capacitor. Using these results, it is easy to explore how well the corner frequency (the 3 dB frequency) is given by

$$f_{3dB} = \frac {1} {2 \pi \hat{ \tau_1 }} \ ,$$

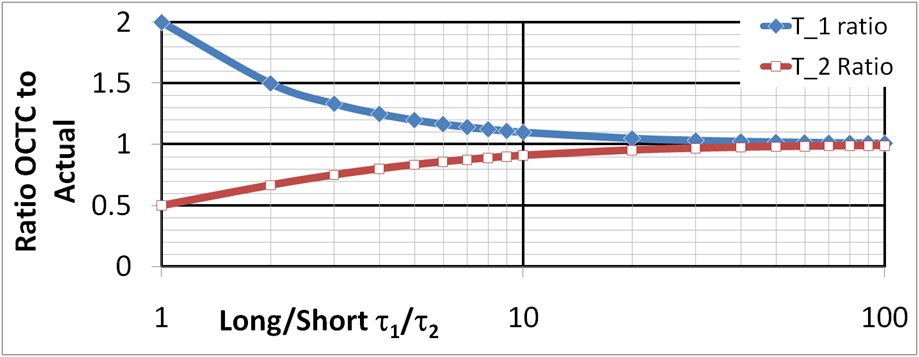
Figure 2: Comparison of OCTC estimates with actual pole positions

as the parameters vary. Also, the exact transfer function can be compared with the approximate one, that is,

$\frac {1} {(1+j \omega \tau_1)(1 + j \omega \tau_2)}\$ $\$ with $\$ $\ \frac {1} {(1+j \omega \hat {\tau_1 })(1 + j \omega \hat { \tau_2} )} \ .$

Of course agreement is good when the assumption τ_{1} >> τ_{2} is accurate.

Figure 2 illustrates the approximation. The x-axis is the ratio τ_{1} / τ_{2} on a logarithmic scale. An increase in this variable means the higher pole is further above the corner frequency. The y-axis is the ratio of the OCTC (open-circuit time constant) estimate to the true time constant. For the lowest pole use curve T_1; this curve refers to the corner frequency; and for the higher pole use curve T_2. The worst agreement is for τ_{1} = τ_{2}. In this case τ^{^}_{1} = 2 τ_{1} and the corner frequency is a factor of 2 too small. The higher pole is a factor of 2 too high (its time constant is half of the real value).

In all cases, the estimated corner frequency is closer than a factor of two from the real one, and always is conservative that is, lower than the real corner, so the actual circuit will behave better than predicted. However, the higher pole always is optimistic, that is, predicts the high pole at a higher frequency than really is the case. To use these estimates for step response predictions, which depend upon the ratio of the two pole frequencies (see article on pole splitting for an example), Figure 2 suggests a fairly large ratio of τ_{1} / τ_{2} is needed for accuracy because the errors in τ^{^}_{1} and τ^{^}_{2} reinforce each other in the ratio τ^{^}_{1} / τ^{^}_{2}.

The open-circuit time constant method focuses upon the corner frequency alone, but as seen above, estimates for higher poles also are possible.

Application of the open-circuit time constant method to a number of single transistor amplifier stages can be found in Pittet and Kandaswamy.
