= Half-power point =

Half-power point may refer to:

- Half-power beamwidth
- Half-power bandwidth
