= FAM control of induction motor =

Field acceleration method (FAM) is the target state variable of the field acceleration method is induction motor torque. In FAM theory, co-ordinate transformation is not involved. It attempts to avoid electromagnetic transients which cause delay in torque control response. First, electromagnetic transients of three-phase induction motor are analyzed. Initial attempt is made to derive `equivalent circuits valid for both steady state and transient states in induction motor.

The key point of FAM control is that the exciting current is kept constant in magnitude and continuous in the equivalent circuit. The speed of rotating air gap flux is made free or adjustable. This means that the magnetic field in the air gap is kept constant in its amplitude and that its speed is adjustable so that a desired value of torque is produced. When the air gap flux is kept constant, other variables like voltages, current and torque are functions of slip frequency only. By accelerating or decelerating rotation of the air gap flux to choose the slip frequency, the torque can be controlled as desired.

== Electromagnetic transients ==
To obtain very quick torque control response in induction motor, it is required to suppress electromagnetic transients which might be caused by the control. Then it is necessary to investigate the electromagnetic transients of an induction motor. Within the induction motor, the largest inductance is the exciting inductance of exciting reactance. Exciting current flows there. If it is accompanied by any transient, delay time constant will be very large. it is necessary to avoid transients of exciting current. It is therefore necessary to maintain continuity of amplitude and phase of exciting current.

== Types of control ==
FAM control of induction motor torque has two types of control namely current control and voltage control. Constant exciting current produces good linearity's between torque and slip frequency. In current control, the primary current is the control input to the induction motor whereas the primary terminal voltage is the control input in voltage control. Two transient phenomena are associated with induction motor operation. One is the mechanical transient of the dynamic system driven by induction motor and the other is the electromagnetic transient within the induction motor. In the first, speed and position of the motor shaft are state variables whereas in latter voltage, current, magnetic field are the state variables. Even though the two systems are interconnected but they can be treated separately. In numerical analysis of electromagnetic transients, it is assumed that the related dynamic state variables are constant and the instantaneous value of the motor torque is found and is fed into the analysis of transients in the dynamic system.

== Performance ==
In FAM control, torque can be controlled by the vector of secondary current.FAM control provides the induction motor with very superior steady state performances based on its T equivalent three circuits which behave same when viewed from primary terminals but differ due to different phenomena occurring in the secondary side.
