= R&L =

R&L or R+L may refer to:

- R&L Carriers (Ralph & Larry), Ralph Larry Roberts Sr. An American Freight company established in 1965 Headquartered in Wilmington Ohio

Relocation and linkage (R&L), an abbreviation in program development in computing

- Rhaegar + Lyanna = Jon, a fan theory regarding the Jon Snow character in the "A Song of Ice and Fire"/"Game of Thrones" fantasy series
- R+L Carriers, an American freight shipping company
- RL circuit, an electrical circuit consisting of R and L components
- R&L Education (Rowman & Littlefield), a publishing house
- Rhett & Link, YouTube duo from Buies Creek, North Carolina
