= RL circuit =

Resistive and inductive circuit

A resistor–inductor circuit (RL circuit), or RL filter or RL network, is an electric circuit composed of resistors and inductors driven by a voltage or current source. A first-order RL circuit is composed of one resistor and one inductor, either in series driven by a voltage source or in parallel driven by a current source. It is one of the simplest analogue infinite impulse response electronic filters.

== Introduction ==
The fundamental passive linear circuit elements are the resistor (R), capacitor (C) and inductor (L). They can be combined to form the RC circuit, the RL circuit, the LC circuit and the RLC circuit, with the abbreviations indicating which components are used. These circuits exhibit important types of behaviour that are fundamental to analogue electronics. In particular, they are able to act as passive filters.

Capacitors are usually preferred to inductors since they can be more easily manufactured and are generally physically smaller, particularly for higher values of components. But parasitic inductance may still be unavoidable.

Both RC and RL circuits form a single-pole filter. Depending on whether the reactive element (C or L) is in series with the load, or parallel with the load will dictate whether the filter is low-pass or high-pass.

Frequently RL circuits are used as DC power supplies for RF amplifiers, where the inductor is used to pass DC bias current and block the RF getting back into the power supply.

== Complex impedance ==
The complex impedance Z_{L} (in ohms) of an inductor with inductance L (in henries) is

$$Z_L = Ls \,.$$

The complex frequency s is a complex number,

$$s = \sigma + j \omega \,,$$

where

- j represents the imaginary unit: j^{2} = −1,
- σ is the exponential decay constant (in radians per second), and
- ω is the angular frequency (in radians per second).

=== Eigenfunctions ===
The complex-valued eigenfunctions of any linear time-invariant (LTI) system are of the following forms:

$$\begin{align}
\mathbf{V}(t) &= \mathbf{A}e^{st} = \mathbf{A}e^{(\sigma + j \omega) t} \\
\mathbf{A} &= A e^{j \phi} \\
\Rightarrow \mathbf{V}(t) &= A e^{j \phi}e^{(\sigma + j \omega) t} \\
&= A e^{\sigma t}e^{j ( \omega t + \phi )} \,.
\end{align}$$

From Euler's formula, the real-part of these eigenfunctions are exponentially-decaying sinusoids:

$$v(t) = \operatorname{Re}{V(t)} = A e^{\sigma t} \cos(\omega t + \phi)\,.$$

=== Sinusoidal steady state ===
Sinusoidal steady state is a special case in which the input voltage consists of a pure sinusoid (with no exponential decay). As a result,

$$\sigma = 0$$

and the evaluation of s becomes

$$s = j \omega \,.$$

== Series circuit ==
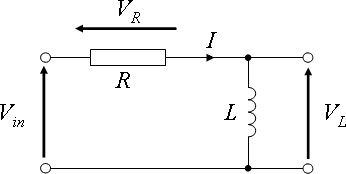
Series RL circuit

By viewing the circuit as a voltage divider, we see that the voltage across the inductor is:

$$V_L(s) = \frac{Ls}{R + Ls}V_\mathrm{in}(s)\,,$$

and the voltage across the resistor is:

$$V_R(s) = \frac{R}{R + Ls}V_\mathrm{in}(s)\,.$$

=== Current ===
The current in the circuit is the same everywhere since the circuit is in series:

$$I(s) = \frac{V_\mathrm{in}(s)}{R + Ls}\,.$$

=== Transfer functions ===
The transfer function to the inductor voltage is

$$H_L(s) = \frac{ V_L(s) }{ V_\mathrm{in}(s) } = \frac{ Ls }{ R + Ls } = G_L e^{j \phi_L} \,.$$

Similarly, the transfer function to the resistor voltage is

$$H_R(s) = \frac{ V_R(s) }{ V_\mathrm{in}(s) } = \frac{ R }{ R + Ls } = G_R e^{j \phi_R} \,.$$

The transfer function, to the current, is

$$H_I(s) = \frac{ I(s) }{ V_\mathrm{in}(s) } = \frac{ 1 }{ R + Ls }  \,.$$

==== Poles and zeros ====
The transfer functions have a single pole located at

$$s = -\frac{R}{L} \,.$$

In addition, the transfer function for the inductor has a zero located at the origin.

=== Gain and phase angle ===
The gains across the two components are found by taking the magnitudes of the above expressions:

$$G_L = \big| H_L(\omega) \big| = \left|\frac{V_L(\omega)}{V_\mathrm{in}(\omega)}\right| = \frac{\omega L}{\sqrt{R^2 + \left(\omega L\right)^2}}$$

and

$$G_R = \big| H_R(\omega) \big| = \left|\frac{V_R(\omega)}{V_\mathrm{in}(\omega)}\right| = \frac{R}{\sqrt{R^2 + \left(\omega L\right)^2}}\,,$$

and the phase angles are:

$$\phi_L = \angle H_L(s) = \tan^{-1}\left(\frac{R}{\omega L}\right)$$

and

$$\phi_R = \angle H_R(s) = \tan^{-1}\left(-\frac{\omega L}{R}\right)\,.$$

=== Phasor notation ===
These expressions together may be substituted into the usual expression for the phasor representing the output:

$$\begin{align}
V_L &= G_{L}V_\mathrm{in} e^{j \phi_L}\\
V_R &= G_{R}V_\mathrm{in}e^{j \phi_R}
\end{align}$$

=== Impulse response ===
The impulse response for each voltage is the inverse Laplace transform of the corresponding transfer function. It represents the response of the circuit to an input voltage consisting of an impulse or Dirac delta function.

The impulse response for the inductor voltage is

$$h_L(t) = \delta(t) -\frac{R}{L} e^{-t\frac{R}{L}} u(t) = \delta(t) -\frac{1}{\tau} e^{-\frac{t}{\tau}} u(t) \,,$$

where u(t) is the Heaviside step function and τ = L/R is the time constant.

Similarly, the impulse response for the resistor voltage is

$$h_R(t) = \frac{R}{L} e^{-t \frac{R}{L}} u(t) = \frac{1}{\tau} e^{-\frac{t}{\tau}} u(t) \,.$$

=== Zero-input response ===
The zero-input response (ZIR), also called the natural response, of an RL circuit describes the behavior of the circuit after it has reached constant voltages and currents and is disconnected from any power source. It is called the zero-input response because it requires no input.

The ZIR of an RL circuit is:

$$I(t) = I(0)e^{-\frac{R}{L} t} = I(0)e^{-\frac{t}{\tau}}\,.$$

=== Frequency domain considerations ===
These are frequency domain expressions. Analysis of them will show which frequencies the circuits (or filters) pass and reject. This analysis rests on a consideration of what happens to these gains as the frequency becomes very large and very small.

As ω → ∞:

$$G_L \to 1 \quad \mbox{and} \quad G_R \to 0\,.$$

As ω → 0:

$$G_L \to 0 \quad \mbox{and} \quad G_R \to 1\,.$$

This shows that, if the output is taken across the inductor, high frequencies are passed and low frequencies are attenuated (rejected). Thus, the circuit behaves as a high-pass filter. If, though, the output is taken across the resistor, high frequencies are rejected and low frequencies are passed. In this configuration, the circuit behaves as a low-pass filter. Compare this with the behaviour of the resistor output in an RC circuit, where the reverse is the case.

The range of frequencies that the filter passes is called its bandwidth. The point at which the filter attenuates the signal to half its unfiltered power is termed its cutoff frequency. This requires that the gain of the circuit be reduced to

$$G_L = G_R = \frac{1}{\sqrt 2}\,.$$

Solving the above equation yields

$$\omega_\mathrm{c} = \frac{R}{L} \mbox{ rad/s} \quad \mbox{or} \quad f_\mathrm{c} = \frac{R}{2\pi L} \mbox{ Hz}\,,$$

which is the frequency that the filter will attenuate to half its original power.

Clearly, the phases also depend on frequency, although this effect is less interesting generally than the gain variations.

As ω → 0:

$$\phi_L \to 90^{\circ} = \frac{\pi}{2} \mbox{ radians} \quad \mbox{and} \quad \phi_R \to 0\,.$$

As ω → ∞:

$$\phi_L \to 0 \quad \mbox{and} \quad \phi_R \to -90^{\circ} = -\frac{\pi}{2} \mbox{ radians}\,.$$

So at DC (0 Hz), the resistor voltage is in phase with the signal voltage while the inductor voltage leads it by 90°. As frequency increases, the resistor voltage comes to have a 90° lag relative to the signal and the inductor voltage comes to be in-phase with the signal.

=== Time domain considerations ===
This section relies on knowledge of e, the natural logarithmic constant.

The most straightforward way to derive the time domain behaviour is to use the Laplace transforms of the expressions for V_{L} and V_{R} given above. This effectively transforms jω → s. Assuming a step input (i.e., V_{in} = 0 before t = 0 and then V_{in} = V afterwards):

$$\begin{align}
V_\mathrm{in}(s) &= V\cdot\frac{1}{s} \\
V_L(s) &= V\cdot\frac{sL}{R + sL}\cdot\frac{1}{s} \\
V_R(s) &= V\cdot\frac{R}{R + sL}\cdot\frac{1}{s}\,.
\end{align}$$

Inductor voltage step-response.

Resistor voltage step-response.

Partial fractions expansions and the inverse Laplace transform yield:

$$\begin{align}
V_L(t) &= Ve^{-t\frac{R}{L}} \\
V_R(t) &= V\left(1 - e^{-t\frac{R}{L}}\right)\,.
\end{align}$$

Thus, the voltage across the inductor tends towards 0 as time passes, while the voltage across the resistor tends towards V, as shown in the figures. This is in keeping with the intuitive point that the inductor will only have a voltage across as long as the current in the circuit is changing — as the circuit reaches its steady-state, there is no further current change and ultimately no inductor voltage.

These equations show that a series RL circuit has a time constant, usually denoted τ = L/R being the time it takes the voltage across the component to either fall (across the inductor) or rise (across the resistor) to within 1/e of its final value. That is, τ is the time it takes V_{L} to reach V(1/e) and V_{R} to reach V(1 − 1/e).

The rate of change is a fractional 1 − 1/e per τ. Thus, in going from t = Nτ to t = (N + 1)τ, the voltage will have moved about 63% of the way from its level at t = Nτ toward its final value. So the voltage across the inductor will have dropped to about 37% after τ, and essentially to zero (0.7%) after about 5τ. Kirchhoff's voltage law implies that the voltage across the resistor will rise at the same rate. When the voltage source is then replaced with a short circuit, the voltage across the resistor drops exponentially with t from V towards 0. The resistor will be discharged to about 37% after τ, and essentially fully discharged (0.7%) after about 5τ. Note that the current, I, in the circuit behaves as the voltage across the resistor does, via Ohm's law.

The delay in the rise or fall time of the circuit is in this case caused by the back-EMF from the inductor which, as the current flowing through it tries to change, prevents the current (and hence the voltage across the resistor) from rising or falling much faster than the time-constant of the circuit. Since all wires have some self-inductance and resistance, all circuits have a time constant. As a result, when the power supply is switched on, the current does not instantaneously reach its steady-state value, V/R. The rise instead takes several time-constants to complete. If this were not the case, and the current were to reach steady-state immediately, extremely strong inductive electric fields would be generated by the sharp change in the magnetic field — this would lead to breakdown of the air in the circuit and electric arcing, probably damaging components (and users).

These results may also be derived by solving the differential equation describing the circuit:

$$\begin{align}
V_\mathrm{in} &= IR + L\frac{dI}{dt} \\
V_R &= V_\mathrm{in} - V_L \,.
\end{align}$$

The first equation is solved by using an integrating factor and yields the current which must be differentiated to give V_{L}; the second equation is straightforward. The solutions are exactly the same as those obtained via Laplace transforms.

=== Short circuit equation ===
For short circuit evaluation, RL circuit is considered. The more general equation is:

$$v_{in} (t)=v_L (t)+ v_R (t)=L\frac{di}{dt} + Ri$$

With initial condition:

$$i(0) = i_0$$

Which can be solved by Laplace transform:

$$V_{in}(s)=sLI-Li_0+RI$$

Thus:

$$I(s)=\frac{Li_o+V_{in}}{sL+R}$$

The inverse Laplace transform will then take the form:

$i(t)=i_s+i_t+i_{ss}$

where $i_s$ is the response from the initial current $i_0$ at $t=0$, $i_t$ is the transient response of the circuit, and $i_{ss}$ is the steady-state response. For all inputs, the inverse transfer takes the form:

$i(t)=i_0 e^{-\frac{R}{L}t}+\mathcal{L}^{-1}\left[\frac{V_{in}}{sL+R}\right]$

Where the inverse Laplace transform represents both the transient and steady-state responses, based on different inputs.

For the case where the source voltage is a Heaviside step function (i.e. a DC voltage source):

$$v_{in}(t)=Eu(t)$$

the transform is:

$$i(t)=i_0 e^{-\frac{R}{L}t}+\mathcal{L}^{-1}\left[\frac{E}{s(sL+R)}\right] = i_0 e^{-\frac{R}{L}t}+\frac{E}{R}\left( 1 - e^{-\frac{R}{L}t} \right)$$

where $\frac{E}{R}e^{-\frac{R}{L}t}$ is the transient response and $\frac{E}{R}$ the steady-state response.

For the case where the source voltage is a sinusoidal function (i.e. an AC voltage source):

$$v_{in}(t)=E\cos(\omega t+\phi)$$

the transform is:

$$i(t)=i_0 e^{-\frac{R}{L}t}+\mathcal{L}^{-1}\left[\frac{\mathcal{L}{[E\cos{\omega t + \phi}]}}{(sL+R)}\right]$$

While solvable, mathematically the transform proves complex. The steady-state portion is more easily determined by calculating the magnitude and phase shift of the input waveform:

$i(t)= i_0 e^{-\frac{R}{L}t}+K_t\left(e^{-\frac{R}{L}t}\right)+|H_I(s)|E\cos\left[\omega t + \phi - \angle{H_I(s)}\right]$

Where $|H_I(s)|$ and $\angle{H_I(s)}$ and the magnitude and phase-shift of $H_I(s)$:

$|H_I(s)|=\frac{1}{|R+sL|}=\frac{1}{\sqrt{{R^2}+{(wL)^2}}}$ and $\angle{H_I(s)}=\angle{\frac{1}{|R+sL|}}=\arctan\left(-\frac{\omega L}{R}\right)$

Which returns:

$i(t)= i_0 e^{-\frac{R}{L}t}+K_t\left(e^{-\frac{R}{L}t}\right)+\frac{E}{\sqrt{{R^2}+{(wL)^2}}}\cos\left[\omega t + \phi - \arctan\left(\frac{\omega L}{R}\right)\right]$

$K_t$ can then be solved using information about the initial conditions. In this example, at $t=0$, $i(0)=i_0$ reducing the equation to:

$i_o = i_0 e^{-\frac{R}{L}*0}+K_t\left(e^{-\frac{R}{L}*0}\right)+\frac{E}{\sqrt{{R^2}+{(wL)^2}}}\cos\left[\omega*0 + \phi - \arctan\left(\frac{\omega L}{R}\right)\right]$

$i_o = i_0 + K_t+\frac{E}{\sqrt{{R^2}+{(wL)^2}}}\cos\left[\phi - \arctan\left(\frac{\omega L}{R}\right)\right]$

$K_t = -\frac{E}{\sqrt{{R^2}+{(wL)^2}}}\cos\left[\phi - \arctan\left(\frac{\omega L}{R}\right)\right]$

Making the final equation: $i(t)= \left[i_0 -\frac{E\cos\left[\phi - \arctan\left(\frac{\omega L}{R}\right)\right]}{\sqrt{{R^2}+{(wL)^2}}}\right]e^{-\frac{R}{L}t} +\frac{E}{\sqrt{{R^2}+{(wL)^2}}}\cos\left[\omega t + \phi - \arctan\left(\frac{\omega L}{R}\right)\right]$

== Parallel circuit ==
Parallel RL circuit

When both the resistor and the inductor are connected in parallel connection and supplied through a voltage source, this is known as a RL parallel circuit. The parallel RL circuit is generally of less interest than the series circuit unless fed by a current source. This is largely because the output voltage (V_{out}) is equal to the input voltage (V_{in}); as a result, this circuit does not act as a filter for a voltage input signal.

With complex impedances:

$$\begin{align}
I_R &= \frac{V_\mathrm{in}}{R} \\
I_L &= \frac{V_\mathrm{in}}{j\omega L} = -\frac{jV_\mathrm{in}}{\omega L}\,.
\end{align}$$

This shows that the inductor lags the resistor (and source) current by 90°.

The parallel circuit is seen on the output of many amplifier circuits, and is used to isolate the amplifier from capacitive loading effects at high frequencies. Because of the phase shift introduced by capacitance, some amplifiers become unstable at very high frequencies, and tend to oscillate. This affects sound quality and component life, especially the transistors.

== See also ==
- LC circuit
- RC circuit
- RLC circuit
- Electrical network
- List of electronics topics
