= TTC =

TTC may refer to:

== Arts and entertainment ==
- Tao Te Ching, the collection of sayings attributed to Lao Tzu
- TTC (band), a French hip-hop trio

== Businesses and organizations ==
- Toronto Transit Commission, a public transit operator in Toronto, Ontario, Canada
- The Teaching Company, an American company that produces recordings of lectures by university professors
- The Tetris Company, owner of the trademark and copyright for Tetris
- Telecommunication Technology Committee, a telecommunications standards body in Japan
- Trade and Technology Council, a diplomatic forum for EU-US trade and tech
- Transmission Technologies Corporation, former name of automobile transmissions manufacturer TREMEC Corporation
- Tuvalu Telecommunications Corporation, telecommunications company in Tuvalu

=== Schools ===
- Tatung Institute of Commerce and Technology, a college in Chiayi City, Taiwan
- Tendring Technology College, a secondary school in Essex, England
- Trident Technical College, a public college in South Carolina, US
- Trinity Theological College (disambiguation)
- Tulsa Technology Center, a public college in Oklahoma, US
- TTC Yangon (Teacher's Training College), a school in Yangon, Myanmar
- Texas Technological College, former name of Texas Tech University, US

== Places ==
- Transbay Transit Center, an intermodal transit station in San Francisco
- Trenton Transit Center, a train station in Trenton, New Jersey
- Transportation and Ticket Center, a transport hub at the Walt Disney World Resort
- Trans-Texas Corridor, an American transportation network of expressways, rails, and utility lines being constructed in Texas
- Trans Thane Creek, a creek running between Thane and Navi Mumbai, India
- Telford Town Centre, an area of central Telford, England, officially known Telford Shopping Centre
- Transportation Technology Center, a federal rail testing facility in Pueblo, Colorado

== Science and technology ==
- General time- and transfer constant analysis, in electronic circuits
- Test-time compute, in machine learning
- Tetrazolium chloride, a redox indicator commonly used in biochemical experiments
- Threshold of Toxicological Concern, in toxicology
- Top trading cycle, an algorithm for trading
- Toyota TTC (Toyota Total Clean system), an emission control technology used by Toyota during the 1970s
- TrueType Collection, a file type packing several TrueType fonts
- Tracking, telemetry, and control, a subsystem of spacecraft and ground segments
- TTC, a codon for the amino acid phenylalanine

== Other uses ==
- Cugir Tokarov, a Romanian variant of the Soviet TT-33 pistol
