= Transfer constant =

Transfer constants are low-frequency gains (or in general ratios of the output to input variables) evaluated under different combinations of shorting and opening of reactive elements in the circuit (i.e., capacitors and inductors). They are used in general time- and transfer constant (TTC) analysis to determine the numerator terms and the zeros in the transfer function. The transfer constants are calculated under similar zero- and infinite-value conditions of reactive elements used in the Cochran-Grabel (CG) method to calculate time constants, but calculating the low-frequency transfer functions from a defined input source to the output terminal, instead of the resistance seen by the reactive elements.

Transfer constants are shown as $H^{ijk\ldots}$, where the superscripts $ijk\ldots$, are the indexes of the elements infinite valued (short-circuited capacitors and open-circuited inductors) in calculation of the transfer constant and the remains elements zero valued. The zeroth order transfer constant $H^0$ denotes the ratio of the output to input when all elements are zero-valued (hence the superscript of 0). $H^0$ often corresponds to the dc gain of the system.
