= Spatial cutoff frequency =

In optics, spatial cutoff frequency is a precise way to quantify the smallest object resolvable by an optical system. Due to diffraction at the image plane, all optical systems act as low-pass filters with a finite ability to resolve detail. If it were not for the effects of diffraction, a 2-inch (51 mm)-aperture telescope could theoretically be used to read newspapers on a planet circling Alpha Centauri, over four light-years distant. Unfortunately, the wave nature of light will never permit this to happen.

The spatial cutoff frequency for a perfectly corrected incoherent optical system is given by
$$f_\text{o} = \frac{1}{\lambda F_\#}\ \text{cycles per millimeter},$$
where $\lambda$ is the wavelength expressed in millimeters, and F_{#} is the lens' focal ratio. As an example, a telescope having an f/6 objective and imaging at 0.55 micrometers has a spatial cutoff frequency of 303 cycles per millimeter. High-resolution black-and-white film is capable of resolving details on the film as small as 3 micrometers or smaller, thus its cutoff frequency is about 150 cycles per millimeter. So, the telescope's optical resolution is about twice that of high-resolution film, and a crisp, sharp picture would result (provided focus is perfect, and atmospheric turbulence is minimal).

This formula gives the best-case resolution performance and is valid only for perfect optical systems. The presence of aberrations reduces image contrast and can effectively reduce the system spatial cutoff frequency if the image contrast falls below the ability of the imaging device to discern.

The coherent case is given by
$$f_\text{o} = \frac{1}{2\lambda F_\#}\ \text{cycles per millimeter}.$$

== See also ==
- Modulation transfer function
- Superlens
