= Stage wash =

Stage wash in professional audio is unwanted sound entering a microphone on stage during a concert. Stage wash can come from the main public address system, from monitor loudspeakers, from instrument amplifiers such as for guitars and keyboards, and from loud instruments such as drums. The effects of stage wash in an overall mix may include a sense of muddiness and lack of detail, as other sounds modulate the desired sound. High-pass filters on mixing consoles can help reduce problems with stage wash by greatly attenuating low frequencies. Other methods of combating stage wash include using hyper-cardioid microphones, exchanging monitor loudspeakers for in-ear monitors, putting instrument amplifiers offstage or in isolation boxes, isolating drum bleed with drum glass and gobos, and employing directional methods and models in the subwoofers and main loudspeaker system.
