= Differentiator =

Type of circuit

In electronics, a differentiator is a circuit that outputs a signal approximately proportional to the rate of change (i.e. the derivative with respect to time) of its input signal. Because the derivative of a sinusoid is another sinusoid whose amplitude is multiplied by its frequency, a true differentiator that works across all frequencies can't be realized (as its gain would have to increase indefinitely as frequency increase). Real circuits such as a 1^{st}-order high-pass filter are able to approximate differentiation at lower frequencies by limiting the gain above its cutoff frequency. An active differentiator includes an amplifier, while a passive differentiator is made only of resistors, capacitors and inductors.

== Passive differentiator ==
The four-terminal 1^{st}-order passive high-pass filter circuits depicted in figure, consisting of a resistor and a capacitor, or alternatively a resistor and an inductor, approximate differentiation at frequencies well-below each filter's cutoff frequency.

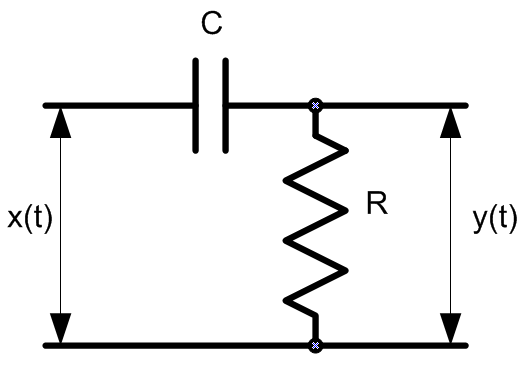
Capacitive differentiator

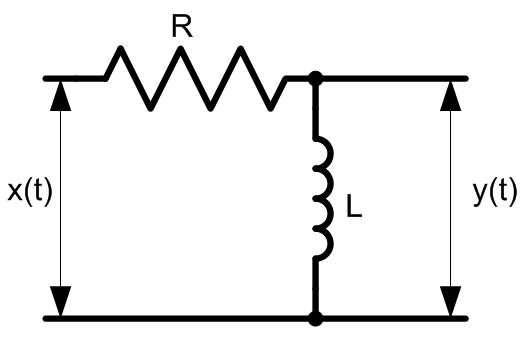
Inductive differentiator

According to Ohm's law, the voltages at the two ends of the capacitive differentiator are related by the following transfer function (which has a zero in the origin and a pole at $s {=} \tfrac{\text{-}1}{RC}$):

$$Y=\frac{Z_R}{Z_R+Z_C}X =\frac{R}{R+\frac{1}{sC}}X =\frac{sRC}{1+sRC}X \implies Y\approx sRCX \quad \text{for} \ |s|\ll \frac{1}{RC}$$

which is a good approximation of an ideal differentiator at frequencies well below the filter's cutoff frequency of $\tfrac{1}{2\pi RC}$ in hertz or $\tfrac{1}{RC}$ in radians.

Similarly, the transfer function of the inductive differentiator has a zero in the origin and a pole in $s {=} \tfrac{\text{-}R}{L}$, corresponding to a cutoff frequency of $\tfrac{R}{2\pi L}$ in hertz or $\tfrac{R}{L}$ in radians.

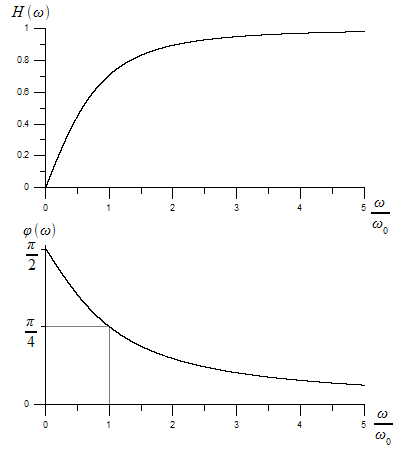
Frequency response function of the passive differentiator circuits, with frequency axis normalized to the cutoff frequency of $\omega_0 {=} \tfrac{1}{RC}$ for the capacitive circuit or $\omega_0 {=} \tfrac{R}{L}$ for the inductive circuit

== Active differentiator ==
=== Ideal differentiator ===
Ideal differentiator.

A differentiator circuit (also known as a differentiating amplifier or inverting differentiator) consists of an ideal operational amplifier with a resistor R providing negative feedback and a capacitor C at the input, such that:

- $V_\text{in}$ is the voltage across C (from the op amp's virtual ground negative terminal).
- $V_\text{out}$ is the voltage across R (also from the op amp's virtual ground negative terminal).
- $I$ is the current flowing from the input through both R and C to the circuit's output.
  - No current flows into the ideal op amp's inputs because they have very high input impedance.

According to the capacitor's current–voltage relation, this current $I$ as it flows from the input through the capacitor to the virtual ground will be proportional to the derivative of the input voltage:

$$I = C \, \frac{dV_\text{in}}{dt} \, .$$

This same current $I$ is converted into a voltage when it travels from the virtual ground through the resistor to the output, according to ohm's law:

$$0 - V_\text{out} = IR \, .$$

Inserting the capacitor's equation for $I$ provides the output voltage as a function of the input voltage:

$$V_\text{out} = -RC \frac{dV_\text{in}}{dt}.$$

Consequently,

- The output voltage is proportional to the time derivative of the input voltage with a gain of $RC .$ Hence, the circuit acts as a differentiator and amplifier.
- The negative sign indicates the output has a 180° phase shift (inversion) with respect to the input.
- The equation is true for any frequency signal, assuming an ideal op amp (though a real op-amp has limited bandwidth).

The op amp's low-impedance output isolates the load of the succeeding stages, so this circuit has the same response independent of its load.

If a constant DC voltage is applied as input, the output voltage is zero. If the input voltage changes from zero to negative, the output voltage is positive. If the applied input voltage changes from zero to positive, the output voltage is negative. If a square-wave input is applied to a differentiator, then a spike waveform is obtained at the output.

==== Operation as high pass filter ====
Treating the capacitor as an impedance with capacitive reactance of X_{c} = 1/2πfC allows analyzing the differentiator as a high pass filter. The inverse-proportionality to frequency means that at low frequency, the reactance of a capacitor is high, and at high frequency reactance is low. Since the feedback configuration provides a gain of R_{f}/X_{c}, that means the gain is low at low frequencies (or for slow changing input), and higher at higher frequencies (or for fast changing input).

==== Frequency response ====
The transfer function of an ideal differentiator is $\tfrac{V_\text{out}}{V_\text{in}} = \text{-}sRC$, resulting in the Bode plot of its magnitude having a positive +20 dB per decade slope over all frequencies and having unity gain at $f_\text{0dB} {=} \tfrac{1}{2\pi RC} \, .$

==== Advantages ====
A small time constant is sufficient to cause differentiation of the input signal.

==== Limitations ====
At high frequencies:

- this simple differentiator circuit becomes unstable and starts to oscillate;
- the circuit becomes sensitive to high frequency noise that, when amplified, dominates the input signal.
- the limited gain–bandwidth product of real op amps will put an upper frequency limit for differentiation

=== Practical differentiator ===

In order to overcome the limitations of the ideal differentiator, an additional small-value capacitor C_{1} is connected in parallel with the feedback resistor R, which prevents the differentiator circuit from oscillating, and a resistor R_{1} is connected in series with the capacitor C, which limits the increase in gain to a ratio of R/R_{1}.

Since negative feedback is present through the resistor R, we can apply the virtual ground concept, that is, the voltage at the inverting terminal is the same 0 volts at the non-inverting terminal.

Applying nodal analysis, we get

$$\frac{0 - V_o}{R} + \frac{0 - V_o}{\frac{1}{sC_1}} + \frac{0 - V_i}{R_1 + \frac{1}{sC}} = 0,$$
$$-V_o \left(\frac{1}{R} + sC_1\right) = \frac{V_i}{R_1 + \frac{1}{sC}}.$$

Therefore,

$$\frac{V_o}{V_i} = \frac{-sRC}{(1 + sR_1C)(1 + sRC_1)}.$$

Hence, there occurs one zero at $s {=} 0$ and one pole at $s {=} \tfrac{\text{-}1}{R_1C}$ (corresponding to a corner frequency of $f_1 {=} \tfrac{1}{2\pi R_1C}$) and another pole at $s {=} \tfrac{\text{-}1}{RC_1}$ (corresponding to a corner frequency of $f_2 {=} \tfrac{1}{2\pi RC_1}$).

==== Frequency response ====
This practical differentiator's frequency response is a band-pass filter with a +20 dB per decade slope over frequency band for differentiation. A straight-line approximation of its Bode plot when normalized with $R_1 C {=} 10^{1}$ and $R C_1 {=} 10^{\text{-}1}$ is:

For the above plot:

- Below $\omega_1$, the circuit attenuates, and well below $\omega_1$ acts like a differentiator.
- Between $\omega_1$ and $\omega_2$, the circuit acts as a voltage follower or buffer.
- Above $\omega_2$, the circuit attenuates, and well above $\omega_2$ acts like an integrator.

Setting $RC_1 {=} R_1C {=} RC$ will produce one zero at $s {=} 0$ and two poles at $s {=} \tfrac{\text{-}1}{RC}$ (corresponding to one corner frequency of $\omega_1 {=} \tfrac{1}{RC}$), resulting in the following frequency response (normalized using $RC {=} 1$):

For the above plot:

- Well below $\omega_1$, the circuit acts like a differentiator;
- Well above $\omega_1$, the circuit acts like an integrator.

=== Applications ===
The differentiator circuit is essentially a high-pass filter. It can generate a square wave from a triangle wave input and produce alternating-direction voltage spikes when a square wave is applied. In ideal cases, a differentiator reverses the effects of an integrator on a waveform, and conversely. Hence, they are most commonly used in wave-shaping circuits to detect high-frequency components in an input signal. Differentiators are an important part of electronic analogue computers and analogue PID controllers. They are also used in frequency modulators as rate-of-change detectors.

A passive differentiator circuit is one of the basic electronic circuits, being widely used in circuit analysis based on the equivalent circuit method.

== See also ==
- Integrator
- Inverting differentiator at op amp applications
