= General time- and transfer constant analysis =

The general time- and transfer-constants (TTC) analysis is the generalized version of the Cochran-Grabel (CG) method, which itself is the generalized version of zero-value time-constants (ZVT), which in turn is the generalization of the open-circuit time constant method (OCT). While the other methods mentioned provide varying terms of only the denominator of an arbitrary transfer function, TTC can be used to determine every term both in the numerator and the denominator. Its denominator terms are the same as those of the Cochran-Grabel method, when stated in terms of time constants (when expressed in Rosenstark notation). However, the numerator terms are determined using a combination of transfer constants and time constants, where the time constants are the same as those in the CG method. Transfer constants are low-frequency ratios of the output variable to input variable under different open- and short-circuited active elements.

In general, a transfer function (which can characterize gain, admittance, impedance, trans-impedance, etc., based on the choice of the input and output variables) can be written as:

$$H(s)= \frac{a_0+a_1 s+a_2s^2+\ldots+a_ms^m}{1+b_1s+b_2s^2+ \ldots +b_ns^n}$$

== The denominator terms ==
The first denominator term $b_1$ can be expressed as the sum of zero value time constants (ZVTs):

$$b_1 = \sum_{i=1}^N \tau_i^0$$

where $\tau_i^0$ is the time constant associated with the reactive element $i$ when all the other sources are zero-valued (hence the superscript '0'). Setting a capacitor value to zero corresponds to an open circuit, while a zero-valued inductor is a short circuit. So for calculation of the $\tau_i^0$, all other capacitors are open-circuited and all other inductors are short-circuited. This is the essence of the ZVT method, which reduces to OCT when only capacitors are involved. All independent sources are also zero-valued during the time constant calculations (voltage sources short-circuited and current source open-circuited). In this case, if the element in question (element $i$) is a capacitor, the time constant is given by

$$\tau_i^0= R_i^0 C_i$$

and when element $i$ is an inductor is it given by:

$$\tau_i^0= L_i/R_i^0$$.

where in both cases, the resistance $R_i^0$, is the resistance seen by element $i$ (denoted by subscript), when all the other elements are zero-valued (denoted by the zero superscript).

The second-order denominator term is equal to:

$$b_2= \sum_{i=1}^{N-1}\sum_{j=i+1}^{N} \tau_i^0 \tau_j^i=\sum_i^{1\leqslant i}\sum_j^{<j\leqslant N} \tau_i^0 \tau_j^i$$

where the second form is the often-used shorthand notation for a sum that does not repeat permutations (e.g., only one of the permutations $\tau_i^0 \tau_j^i$ and $\tau_j^0 \tau_i^j$ are counted).

The second order time constant, $\tau_i^j$, is simply the time constant associated with the reactive element $i$ (where subscript always denotes the index of the element in question), when element $j$ is infinite valued. In this notation, the superscript always denotes the index of the element (or elements) being infinite valued, with superscript zero implying all elements are zero-valued. Infinite-valued capacitors are short circuits, while infinite-value inductors are open circuits.

In general, any denominator terms can be expressed as:

$$b_n =\sum_i^{1\leqslant i<}\sum_j^{j<k}\sum_{k \cdots}^{\ldots \leqslant N} \ldots \tau_i^0 \tau_j^i \tau_k^{ij} \ldots$$

where $\tau_i^{jkl\ldots}$ is the time constant of associated with element $i$, when all the elements with an index in the superscript (i.e., $jkl\ldots$) are infinite valued (shorted capacitors and opened inductors). Usually, the higher-order time constants involve simpler calculations, as there are more infinite valued elements involved during their calculations.

== The numerator terms ==
The major addition in the TTC over the Cochran-Grabel method is its ability to calculate all the numerator terms in a similar fashion using the same time constants used for the denominator calculation in conjunction with transfer constants, denoted as $H^{ijk\ldots}$. Transfer constants are low-frequency gains (or, in general, ratios of the output to input variables) under different combinations of reactive elements being zero and infinite valued. The notation uses the same convention, with all the elements whose indexes appear in the superscript of $H$, being infinite valued (shorted capacitors and opened inductors) and all unlisted elements zero-valued. The zeroth order transfer constant $H^0$ denotes the ratio of the output to input when all elements are zero-valued (hence the superscript of 0).

Using the time constants and transfer constants, all terms of the numerator can be calculated. In particular:

$$a_0 = H^0$$

which is the transfer constant when all elements are zero-valued (e.g., dc gain).

The first order numerator term can be expressed as the sum of the products of first-order transfer constants $H^i$ and their associated zero value time constants, $\tau_i^0$,

$$a_1=\sum_{i=1}^N \tau_i^0 H^i$$

where transfer constant, $H^i$, is the ratio of the output to input when element $i$ is infinite valued and all others are zero valued. Similarly, the second-order numerator term is given by

$$a_2=\sum_i^{1\leqslant i}\sum_j^{<j\leqslant N} \tau_i^0 \tau_j^i H^{ij}$$

where, again, transfer constant, $H^{ij}$, is the transfer constant when both element $i$ and $j$ are infinite valued (all else zero valued).

In general, the $n$th numerator term is given by:

$$a_n =\sum_i^{1\leqslant i<}\sum_j^{j<k}\sum_{k \cdots}^{\ldots \leqslant N} \ldots \tau_i^0 \tau_j^i \tau_k^{ij} \ldots H^{ijk \ldots}$$

This allows for full calculation of any transfer function to any degree of accuracy by generating a sufficient number of numerator and denominator terms using the above expressions.
