= High-pass filter =

Type of electronic circuit or optical filter

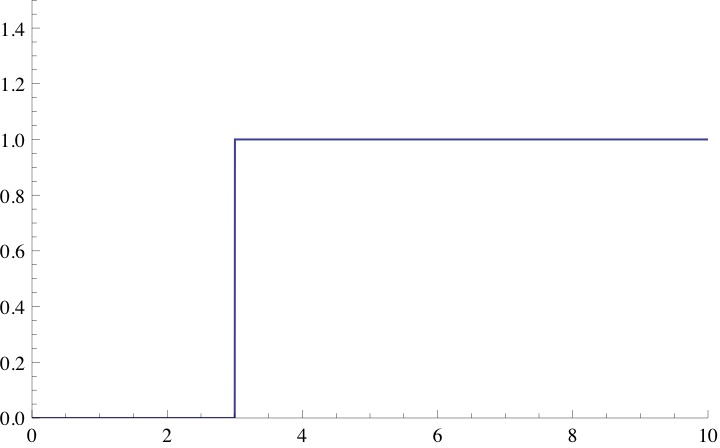
Ideal high-pass filter frequency response

A high-pass filter (HPF) is an electronic filter that passes signals with a frequency higher than a certain cutoff frequency and attenuates signals with frequencies lower than the cutoff frequency. The amount of attenuation for each frequency depends on the filter design. A high-pass filter is usually modeled as a linear time-invariant system. It is sometimes called a low-cut filter or bass-cut filter in the context of audio engineering. High-pass filters have many uses, such as blocking DC from circuitry sensitive to non-zero average voltages or radio frequency devices. They can also be used in conjunction with a low-pass filter to produce a band-pass filter.

In the optical domain filters are often characterised by wavelength rather than frequency. High-pass and low-pass have the opposite meanings, with a "high-pass" filter (more commonly "short-pass") passing only shorter wavelengths (higher frequencies), and vice versa for "low-pass" (more commonly "long-pass").

== Description ==
In electronics, a filter is a two-port electronic circuit which removes frequency components from a signal (time-varying voltage or current) applied to its input port. A high-pass filter attenuates frequency components below a certain frequency, called its cutoff frequency, allowing higher frequency components to pass through. This contrasts with a low-pass filter, which attenuates frequencies higher than a certain frequency, and a bandpass filter, which allows a certain band of frequencies through and attenuates frequencies both higher and lower than the band.

In optics a high pass filter is a transparent or translucent window of colored material that allows light longer than a certain wavelength to pass through and attenuates light of shorter wavelengths. Since light is often measured not by frequency but by wavelength, which is inversely related to frequency, a high pass optical filter, which attenuates light frequencies below a cutoff frequency, is often called a short-pass filter; it attenuates longer wavelengths.

== Continuous-time circuits ==
=== First-order passive ===
Figure 1: A passive, analog, first-order high-pass filter, realized by an RC circuit

A resistor and either a capacitor or an inductor can be configured as a first-order high-pass filter. The simple first-order capacitive high-pass filter shown in Figure 1 is implemented by placing an input voltage across the series combination of a capacitor and a resistor and using the voltage across the resistor as an output. The transfer function of this linear time-invariant system is:

$$\frac{V_{\rm out}(s)}{V_{\rm in}(s)}=\frac{sRC}{1+sRC}.$$

The product of the resistance and capacitance (R×C) is the time constant (τ); it is inversely proportional to the cutoff frequency f_{c}, that is,

$$f_c = \frac{1}{2 \pi \tau} = \frac{1}{2 \pi R C},\,$$

where f_{c} is in hertz, τ is in seconds, R is in ohms, and C is in farads. At the cutoff frequency, the filter's frequency response reaches -3dB referenced to the gain at an infinite frequency.

=== First-order active ===
Figure 2: An active high-pass filter

Figure 2 shows an active electronic implementation of a first-order high-pass filter using an operational amplifier. The transfer function of this linear time-invariant system is:

$$\frac{V_{\rm out}(s)}{V_{\rm in}(s)}=\frac{-sR_2C}{1+sR_1C}.$$

In this case, the filter has a passband gain of −R_{2}/R_{1} and has a cutoff frequency of

$$f_c = \frac{1}{2 \pi \tau} = \frac{1}{2 \pi R_1 C},\,$$

Because this filter is active, it may have non-unity passband gain. That is, high-frequency signals are inverted and amplified by R_{2}/R_{1}.

All of these first-order high-pass filters are called differentiators, because they perform differentiation for signals whose frequency band is well below the filter's cutoff frequency.

=== Higher orders ===
Filters of higher order have steeper slope in the stopband, such that the slope of n^{th}-order filters equals 20n dB per decade. Higher order filters can be achieved simply by cascading these first order filters. While impedance matching and loading must be taken into account when chaining passive filters, active filters can be easily chained because the signal is restored by the output of the op amp at each stage. Various filter topologies and network synthesis filters for higher orders exist, which ease design.

== Discrete-time realization ==
Discrete-time high-pass filters can also be designed. Discrete-time filter design is beyond the scope of this article; however, a simple example comes from the conversion of the continuous-time high-pass filter above to a discrete-time realization. That is, the continuous-time behavior can be discretized.

From the circuit in Figure 1 above, according to Kirchhoff's Laws and the definition of capacitance:

$$\begin{cases}
V_{\text{out}}(t) = I(t)\, R &\text{(V)}\\
Q_c(t) = C \, \left( V_{\text{in}}(t) - V_{\text{out}}(t) \right) &\text{(Q)}\\
I(t) = \frac{\operatorname{d} Q_c}{\operatorname{d} t} &\text{(I)}
\end{cases}$$

where $Q_c(t)$ is the charge stored in the capacitor at time $t$. Substituting Equation (Q) into Equation (I) and then Equation (I) into Equation (V) gives:

$$V_{\text{out}}(t) = \overbrace{C \, \left( \frac{\operatorname{d} V_{\text{in}}}{\operatorname{d}t} - \frac{\operatorname{d} V_{\text{out}}}{\operatorname{d}t} \right)}^{I(t)} \, R = R C \, \left( \frac{ \operatorname{d} V_{\text{in}}}{\operatorname{d}t} - \frac{\operatorname{d} V_{\text{out}}}{\operatorname{d}t} \right)$$

This equation can be discretized. For simplicity, assume that samples of the input and output are taken at evenly spaced points in time separated by $\Delta_T$ time. Let the samples of $V_{\text{in}}$ be represented by the sequence $(x_1, x_2, \ldots, x_n)$, and let $V_{\text{out}}$ be represented by the sequence $(y_1, y_2, \ldots, y_n)$ which correspond to the same points in time. Making these substitutions:

$$y_i = R C \, \left( \frac{x_i - x_{i-1}}{\Delta_T} - \frac{y_i - y_{i-1}}{\Delta_T} \right)$$

And rearranging terms gives the recurrence relation

$$y_i = \overbrace{\frac{RC}{RC + \Delta_T} y_{i-1}}^{\text{Decaying contribution from prior inputs}} + \overbrace{\frac{RC}{RC + \Delta_T} \left( x_i -  x_{i-1} \right)}^{\text{Contribution from change in input}}$$

That is, this discrete-time implementation of a simple continuous-time RC high-pass filter is

$$y_i = \alpha y_{i-1} + \alpha (x_{i} - x_{i-1}) \qquad \text{where} \qquad \alpha \triangleq \frac{RC}{RC + \Delta_T}$$

By definition, $0 \leq \alpha \leq 1$. The expression for parameter $\alpha$ yields the equivalent time constant $RC$ in terms of the sampling period $\Delta_T$ and $\alpha$:

$$RC = \Delta_T \left( \frac{\alpha}{1 - \alpha} \right)$$.

Recalling that

$f_c=\frac{1}{2\pi RC}$ so $RC=\frac{1}{2\pi f_c}$

then $\alpha$ and $f_c$ are related by:

$$\alpha = \frac{1}{2\pi \Delta_T f_c + 1}$$

and

$$f_c=\frac{1-\alpha}{2\pi \alpha \Delta_T}$$.

If $\alpha = 0.5$, then the $RC$ time constant equal to the sampling period. If $\alpha \ll 0.5$, then $RC$ is significantly smaller than the sampling interval, and $RC \approx \alpha \Delta_T$.

=== Algorithmic implementation ===
The filter recurrence relation provides a way to determine the output samples in terms of the input samples and the preceding output. The following pseudocode algorithm will simulate the effect of a high-pass filter on a series of digital samples, assuming equally spaced samples:

// Return RC high-pass filter output samples, given input samples,
// time interval dt, and time constant RC
function highpass(real[1..n] x, real dt, real RC)
    var real[1..n] y
    var real α := RC / (RC + dt)
    y[1] := x[1]
    for i from 2 to n
        y[i] := α × y[i−1] + α × (x[i] − x[i−1])
    return y

The loop which calculates each of the $n$ outputs can be refactored into the equivalent:

    for i from 2 to n
        y[i] := α × (y[i−1] + x[i] − x[i−1])

However, the earlier form shows how the parameter α changes the impact of the prior output y[i-1] and current change in input (x[i] - x[i-1]). In particular,

- A large α implies that the output will decay very slowly but will also be strongly influenced by even small changes in input. By the relationship between parameter α and time constant $RC$ above, a large α corresponds to a large $RC$ and therefore a low corner frequency of the filter. Hence, this case corresponds to a high-pass filter with a very narrow stopband. Because it is excited by small changes and tends to hold its prior output values for a long time, it can pass relatively low frequencies. However, a constant input (i.e., an input with {{{1}}}) will always decay to zero, as would be expected with a high-pass filter with a large $RC$.
- A small α implies that the output will decay quickly and will require large changes in the input (i.e., (x[i] - x[i-1]) is large) to cause the output to change much. By the relationship between parameter α and time constant $RC$ above, a small α corresponds to a small $RC$ and therefore a high corner frequency of the filter. Hence, this case corresponds to a high-pass filter with a very wide stopband. Because it requires large (i.e., fast) changes and tends to quickly forget its prior output values, it can only pass relatively high frequencies, as would be expected with a high-pass filter with a small $RC$.

== Applications ==
=== Audio ===
High-pass filters have many applications. They are used as part of an audio crossover to direct high frequencies to a tweeter while attenuating bass signals which could interfere with, or damage, the speaker. When such a filter is built into a loudspeaker cabinet it is normally a passive filter that also includes a low-pass filter for the woofer and so often employs both a capacitor and inductor (although very simple high-pass filters for tweeters can consist of a series capacitor and nothing else). As an example, the formula above, applied to a tweeter with a resistance of 10 Ω, will determine the capacitor value for a cut-off frequency of 5 kHz. $C = \frac{1}{2 \pi f R} = \frac{1}{6.28 \times 5000 \times 10} = 3.18 \times 10^{-6}$, or approx 3.2 μF.

An alternative, which provides good quality sound without inductors (which are prone to parasitic coupling, are expensive, and may have significant internal resistance) is to employ bi-amplification with active RC filters or active digital filters with separate power amplifiers for each loudspeaker. Such low-current and low-voltage line level crossovers are called active crossovers.

Rumble filters are high-pass filters applied to the removal of unwanted sounds near to the lower end of the audible range or below. For example, noises (e.g., footsteps, or motor noises from record players and tape decks) may be removed because they are undesired or may overload the RIAA equalization circuit of the preamp.

High-pass filters are also used for AC coupling at the inputs of many audio power amplifiers, for preventing the amplification of DC currents which may harm the amplifier, rob the amplifier of headroom, and generate waste heat at the loudspeakers voice coil. One amplifier, the professional audio model DC300 made by Crown International beginning in the 1960s, did not have high-pass filtering at all, and could be used to amplify the DC signal of a common 9-volt battery at the input to supply 18 volts DC in an emergency for mixing console power. However, that model's basic design has been superseded by newer designs such as the Crown Macro-Tech series developed in the late 1980s which included 10 Hz high-pass filtering on the inputs and switchable 35 Hz high-pass filtering on the outputs. Another example is the QSC Audio PLX amplifier series which includes an internal 5 Hz high-pass filter which is applied to the inputs whenever the optional 50 and 30 Hz high-pass filters are turned off.

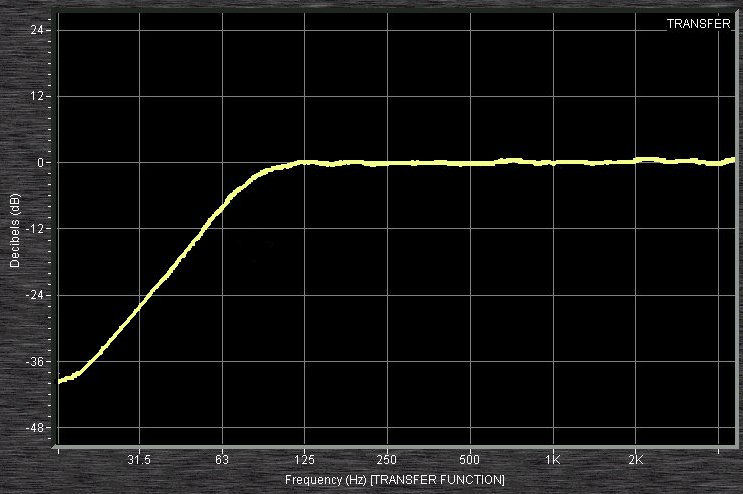
A 75 Hz "low cut" filter from an input channel of a Mackie 1402 mixing console as measured by Smaart software. This high-pass filter has a slope of 18 dB per octave.

Mixing consoles often include high-pass filtering at each channel strip. Some models have fixed-slope, fixed-frequency high-pass filters at 80 or 100 Hz that can be engaged; other models have sweepable high-pass filters, filters of fixed slope that can be set within a specified frequency range, such as from 20 to 400 Hz on the Midas Heritage 3000, or 20 to 20,000 Hz on the Yamaha M7CL digital mixing console. Veteran systems engineer and live sound mixer Bruce Main recommends that high-pass filters be engaged for most mixer input sources, except for those such as kick drum, bass guitar and piano, sources which will have useful low-frequency sounds. Main writes that DI unit inputs (as opposed to microphone inputs) do not need high-pass filtering as they are not subject to modulation by low-frequency stage wash—low frequency sounds coming from the subwoofers or the public address system and wrapping around to the stage. Main indicates that high-pass filters are commonly used for directional microphones which have a proximity effect—a low-frequency boost for very close sources. This low-frequency boost commonly causes problems up to 200 or 300 Hz, but Main notes that he has seen microphones that benefit from a 500 Hz high-pass filter setting on the console.

=== Image ===
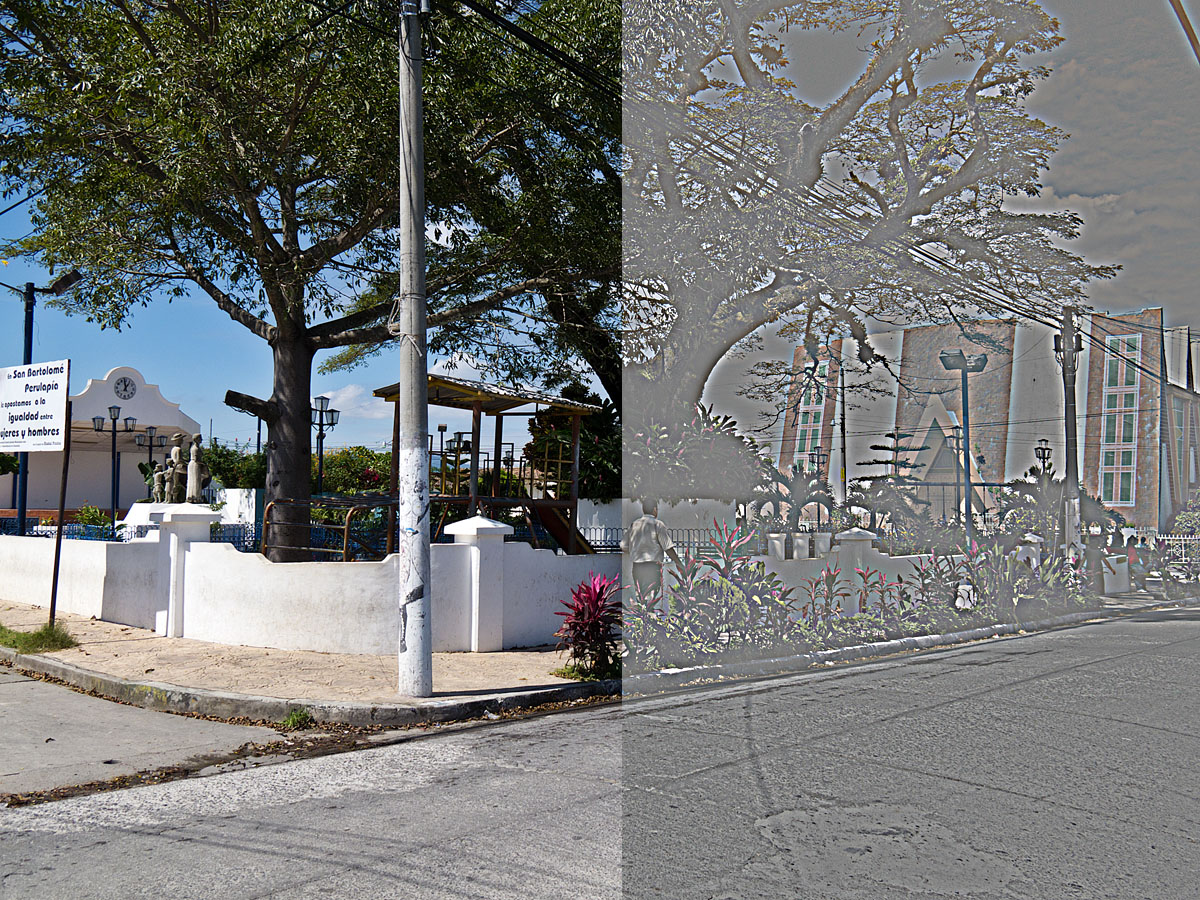
Example of high-pass filter applied to the right half of a photograph. The left side is unmodified, Right side is with a high-pass filter applied (in this case, with a radius of 4.9).

High-pass and low-pass filters are also used in digital image processing to perform image modifications, enhancements, noise reduction, etc., using designs done in either the spatial domain or the frequency domain. The unsharp masking, or sharpening, operation used in image editing software is a high-boost filter, a generalization of high-pass.

== See also ==
- DSL filter
- Band-stop filter
- Bias tee
- Differentiator
- Convolution
- Circular convolution
