= Time constant =

Characteristic time in a system

In physics and engineering, the time constant, usually denoted by the Greek letter τ (tau), is the parameter characterizing the response to a step input of a first-order, linear time-invariant (LTI) system. (Note: Concretely, a first-order LTI system is a system that can be modeled by a single first order differential equation in time. Examples include the simplest single-stage electrical RC circuits and RL circuits.) The time constant is the main characteristic unit of a first-order LTI system. It gives speed of the response. For example, in a simple RC circuit driven by a step change in voltage, the time constant τ = RC sets how quickly the capacitor voltage charges toward its new steady-state value.

In the time domain, the usual choice to explore the time response is through the step response to a step input, or the impulse response to a Dirac delta function input. In the frequency domain (for example, looking at the Fourier transform of the step response, or using an input that is a simple sinusoidal function of time) the time constant also determines the bandwidth of a first-order time-invariant system, that is, the frequency at which the output signal power drops to half the value it has at low frequencies. Time constants of this kind appear in many areas of physics and engineering, including electrical circuits, thermal systems, excitable membranes in biophysics, radioactive decay, and the response of meteorological sensors.

The time constant is also used to characterize the frequency response of various signal processing systems – magnetic tapes, radio transmitters and receivers, record cutting and replay equipment, and digital filters – which can be modelled or approximated by first-order LTI systems. Other examples include time constant used in control systems for integral and derivative action controllers, which are often pneumatic, rather than electrical.

Time constants are a feature of the lumped system analysis (lumped capacity analysis method) for thermal systems, used when objects cool or warm uniformly under the influence of convective cooling or warming.

Physically, the time constant represents the elapsed time required for the system response to decay to zero if the system had continued to decay at the initial rate, because of the progressive change in the rate of decay the response will have actually decreased in value to 1 / e ≈ 36.8% in this time (say from a step decrease). In an increasing system, the time constant is the time for the system's step response to reach 1 − 1 / e ≈ 63.2% of its final (asymptotic) value (say from a step increase). In radioactive decay the time constant is related to the decay constant (λ), and it represents both the mean lifetime of a decaying system (such as an atom) before it decays, or the time it takes for all but 36.8% of the atoms to decay. For this reason, the time constant is longer than the half-life, which is the time for only 50% of the atoms to decay.

In practical terms, the time constant is the characteristic time scale over which a first-order system responds to a sudden change in its input. For an increasing first-order response, one time constant is the time it takes the output to reach about 63% (~ 63.2%) of its final value, and for a decreasing response it is the time to fall to about 37% (~ 36.8%) of its initial value.

== Differential equation ==
First-order LTI systems are characterized by the differential equation
$$\tau \frac{dV}{dt} + V = f(t)$$
where τ represents the exponential decay constant and V is a function of time t
$$V = V(t).$$
The right-hand side is the forcing function f(t) describing an external driving function of time, which can be regarded as the system input, to which V(t) is the response, or system output. Classical examples for f(t) are:

The Heaviside step function, often denoted by u(t):
$$u(t) = \begin{cases} 0, & t < 0 \\ 1, & t \ge 0 \end{cases}$$
the impulse function, often denoted by δ(t), and also the sinusoidal input function:
$$f(t) = A \sin(2 \pi f t)$$
or
$$f(t) = A e^{j \omega t },$$
where A is the amplitude of the forcing function, f is the frequency in Hertz, and ω = 2π f is the frequency in radians per second. For a first-order system this differential equation corresponds to a single real pole at -1/τ; smaller values of τ therefore describe systems that respond more quickly to changes in their inputs.

=== Exponential decay example ===
An example solution to the differential equation with initial value V_{0} and no forcing function is
$$V(t) = V_0 e^{-t / \tau}$$
where
$$V_0 = V(t=0)$$
is the initial value of V. Thus, the response is an exponential decay with time constant τ. The time constant sets the characteristic time scale of this decay: after one time constant, the response has decayed to about 37% of its initial value, and after several time constants, it is effectively close to zero.

==== Example decay values over time ====
- Let $t=0$; then $V = V_0 e^0$, and so $V=V_0$
- Let $t= \tau$; then $V=V_0 e^{-1} \approx 0.37 V_0$. In other words, after a period of one time constant, the function reaches e^{−1} = approximately 37% of its initial value, meaning that about 63% of the total decay has occurred.
- Let $t=5 \tau$; then $V = V_0 e^{-5} \approx 0.0067V_0$, which is less than 1% of its original. In many applications, this 1% threshold is taken to mean that, after about five time constants, the exponential response has effectively reached its final value.
- Let $t \to \infty$; then $\lim_{t \to \infty} [V_0 e^{-t / \tau}] = 0$. Thus while the function asymptotically decays to 0, it would take an infinite amount of time to actually reach 0.

== Relation of time constant to bandwidth ==
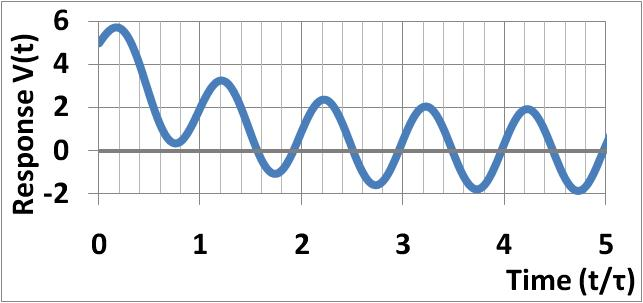
An example response of system to sine wave forcing function. Time axis in units of the time constant τ. The response damps out to become a simple sine wave.

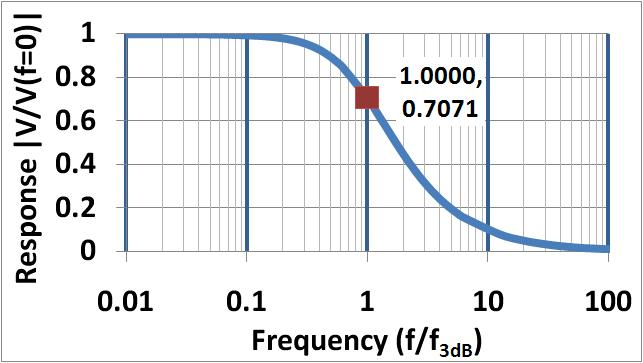
Frequency response of system vs. frequency in units of the bandwidth f_{3dB}. The response is normalized to a zero frequency value of unity, and drops to 1/√2 at the bandwidth.

Suppose the forcing function is chosen as sinusoidal so:
$$\tau \frac{dV}{dt} + V = f(t) = Ae^{j \omega t }.$$

(Response to a real cosine or sine wave input can be obtained by taking the real or imaginary part of the final result by virtue of Euler's formula.) The general solution to this equation for times t ≥ 0 s, assuming V(t = 0) = V_{0} is:
$$\begin{align}
V(t) &= V_0e^{-t/\tau} + \frac{Ae^{-t/\tau}}{\tau}\int_0^t \, dt'\ e^{t'/\tau} e^{j\omega t'} \\[1ex]
&= V_0 e^{-t/\tau} + \frac{\frac 1  \tau}{j\omega + \frac 1 \tau} A\left( e^{j \omega t} - e^{-t/\tau}\right).
\end{align}$$

For long times the decaying exponentials become negligible and the steady-state solution or long-time solution is:
$$V_{\infty}(t) = \frac{1/\tau}{j\omega +1/\tau}Ae^{j \omega t}.$$

The magnitude of this response is:
$$|V_{\infty}(t)| = A\frac{1}{\tau\left(\omega^2 +(1/\tau)^2\right)^{1/2}} = A \frac{1}{\sqrt{1+(\omega \tau)^2 }}.$$
By convention, the bandwidth of this system is the frequency where |V_{∞}|^{2} drops to half-value, or where ωτ = 1. This is the usual bandwidth convention, defined as the frequency range where power drops by less than half (at most −3 dB). Using the frequency in hertz, rather than radians/s (ω = 2πf):
$$f_\mathrm{3dB} = \frac {1}{2 \pi \tau}.$$

The notation f_{3dB} stems from the expression of power in decibels and the observation that half-power corresponds to a drop in the value of |V_{∞}| by a factor of 1/√2 or by 3 decibels.

Thus, the time constant determines the bandwidth of this system: a smaller time constant corresponds to a higher -3 dB bandwidth (allowing the system to follow faster variations in the input), while a larger time constant corresponds to a lower bandwidth and a slower response.

== Step response with arbitrary initial conditions ==
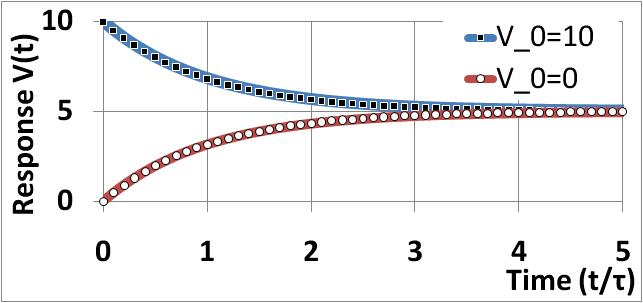
Step response of system for two different initial values V_{0}, one above the final value and one at zero. Long-time response is a constant, V_{∞}. Time axis in units of the time constant $\tau$.

Suppose the forcing function is chosen as a step input so:
$$\frac{dV}{dt} + \frac{1}{\tau} V = f(t) = A u(t),$$
with u(t) the unit step function. The general solution to this equation for times t ≥ 0 s, assuming V(t = 0) = V_{0} is:
$$V(t) = V_0 e^{-t/\tau} + A \tau \left( 1 - e^{-t/\tau}\right).$$

(It may be observed that this response is the ω → 0 limit of the above response to a sinusoidal input.)

The long-time solution is time independent and independent of initial conditions:
$$V_{\infty} = A \tau.$$

The time constant remains the same for the same system regardless of the starting conditions. Simply stated, a system approaches its final, steady-state situation at a constant rate, regardless of how close it is to that value at any arbitrary starting point.

For example, consider an electric motor whose startup is well modelled by a first-order LTI system. Suppose that when started from rest, the motor takes 1/8 of a second to reach 63% of its nominal speed of 100 RPM, or 63 RPM—a shortfall of 37 RPM. Then it will be found that after the next 1/8 of a second, the motor has sped up an additional 23 RPM, which equals 63% of that 37 RPM difference. This brings it to 86 RPM—still 14 RPM low. After a third 1/8 of a second, the motor will have gained an additional 9 RPM (63% of that 14 RPM difference), putting it at 95 RPM.

In fact, given any initial speed s ≤ 100 RPM, 1/8 of a second later this particular motor will have gained an additional 0.63 × (100 − s) RPM.

== Examples ==
=== Time constants in electrical circuits ===
Capacitor voltage step-response

Inductor voltage step-response

In an RL circuit composed of a single resistor and inductor, the time constant $\tau$ (in seconds) is
$$\tau = \frac{ L }{ R }$$
where R is the resistance (in ohms) and L is the inductance (in henrys).

Similarly, in an RC circuit composed of a single resistor and capacitor, the time constant $\tau$ (in seconds) is:
$$\tau = R C$$
where R is the resistance (in ohms) and C is the capacitance (in farads).

Electrical circuits are often more complex than these examples, and may exhibit multiple time constants (See Step response and Pole splitting for some examples.) In the case where feedback is present, a system may exhibit unstable, increasing oscillations. In addition, physical electrical circuits are seldom truly linear systems except for very low amplitude excitations; however, the approximation of linearity is widely used.

In digital electronic circuits another measure, the FO4 (fanout of 4) is often used. This can be converted to time constant units via the equation $5\tau = \text{FO4}$.

For example, if R = 100 kΩ and C = 10 µF, the time constant is τ = RC = 1s, so the capacitor voltage reaches about 63% of its final value after 1 second following a step change in the applied voltage.

=== Thermal time constant ===
Time constants are a feature of the lumped system analysis (lumped capacity analysis method) for thermal systems, used when objects cool or warm uniformly under the influence of convective cooling or warming. In this case, the heat transfer from the body to the ambient at a given time is proportional to the temperature difference between the body and the ambient:
$$F = hA_s \left( T(t) - T_a\right ),$$
where h is the heat transfer coefficient, and A_{s} is the surface area, T is the temperature function, i.e., T(t) is the body temperature at time t, and T_{a} is the constant ambient temperature. The positive sign indicates the convention that F is positive when heat is leaving the body because its temperature is higher than the ambient temperature (F is an outward flux). As heat is lost to the ambient, this heat transfer leads to a drop in temperature of the body given by:
$$\rho c_p V \frac {dT}{dt} = -F,$$
where ρ = density, c_{p} = specific heat and V is the body volume. The negative sign indicates the temperature drops when the heat transfer is outward from the body (that is, when F > 0). Equating these two expressions for the heat transfer,
$$\rho c_p V \frac {dT}{dt} = -hA_s \left( T(t) - T_a \right).$$

Evidently, this is a first-order LTI system that can be cast in the form:
$$\frac {dT}{dt} +\frac {1}{\tau} T = \frac{1}{\tau} T_a,$$
with
$$\tau = \frac{\rho c_p V}{hA_s}.$$

In other words, larger masses ρV with higher heat capacities c_{p} lead to slower changes in temperature (longer time constant τ), while larger surface areas A_{s} with higher heat transfer h lead to more rapid temperature change (shorter time constant τ).

This lumped-parameter model is typically valid when internal temperature gradients are small, for example when the Biot number is less than about 0.1.

Comparison with the introductory differential equation suggests the possible generalization to time-varying ambient temperatures T_{a}. However, retaining the simple constant ambient example, by substituting the variable ΔT ≡ (T − T_{a}), one finds:
$$\frac {d\Delta T}{dt} +\frac {1}{\tau} \Delta T = 0.$$

Systems for which cooling satisfies the above exponential equation are said to satisfy Newton's law of cooling. The solution to this equation suggests that, in such systems, the difference between the temperature of the system and its surroundings ΔT as a function of time t, is given by:
$$\Delta T(t) = \Delta T_0 e^{-t/\tau},$$
where ΔT_{0} is the initial temperature difference, at time t = 0. In words, the body assumes the same temperature as the ambient at an exponentially slow rate determined by the time constant.

=== Time constants in biophysics ===
In an excitable cell such as a muscle or neuron, the membrane time constant is the time constant that characterizes how quickly the membrane potential changes, and is
$$\tau = r_m c_m$$
where r_{m} is the resistance across the membrane and c_{m} is the capacitance of the membrane.

The resistance across the membrane is a function of the number of open ion channels and the capacitance is a function of the properties of the lipid bilayer.

The time constant is used to describe the rise and fall of membrane voltage, where the rise is described by
$$V(t) = V_{\max} \left(1 - e^{-t /\tau}\right)$$
and the fall is described by
$$V(t) = V_{\max} e^{-t /\tau}$$
where voltage is in millivolts, time is in seconds, and $\tau$ is in seconds.

V_{max} is defined as the maximum voltage change from the resting potential, where
$$V_{\max} = r_m I$$
where r_{m} is the resistance across the membrane and I is the membrane current.

Setting for t = $\tau$ for the rise sets V(t) equal to 0.63V_{max}. This means that the time constant is the time elapsed after 63% of V_{max} has been reached

Setting for t = $\tau$ for the fall sets V(t) equal to 0.37V_{max}, meaning that the time constant is the time elapsed after it has fallen to 37% of V_{max}.

The larger a time constant is, the slower the rise or fall of the potential of a neuron. A long time constant can result in temporal summation, in which repeated synaptic inputs are algebraically summated over time. A short time constant instead favorscoincidence detection through spatial summation, because inputs must arrive within a narrow time window to have a strong combined effect.

=== Exponential decay ===
In exponential decay, such as of a radioactive isotope, the time constant can be interpreted as the mean lifetime. The half-life T_{HL} or T_{1/2} is related to the exponential decay constant $\tau$ by
$$T_{1/2} = T_\text{HL} = \tau \ln 2.$$
The reciprocal of the time constant is called the decay constant, and is denoted $\lambda = 1/\tau$.

=== Meteorological sensors ===
For a meteorological sensor, the time constant is the time it takes the measured value to reach about 63% of the total change after a sudden step change in the true environmental condition.

This most often applies to measurements of temperature, dew-point temperature, humidity and air pressure. Radiosondes are especially affected due to their rapid increase in altitude. A larger time constant tends to smooth out rapid fluctuations and can underestimate short-lived extremes, whereas a smaller time constant allows the instrument to follow rapid changes more closely.

== See also ==
- RC time constant
- Cutoff frequency
- Exponential decay
- Lead–lag compensator
- Length constant
- Rise time
- Fall time
- Frequency response
- Impulse response
- Step response
- Settling time
