= System analysis =

Field of electrical engineering

System analysis in the field of electrical engineering characterizes electrical systems and their properties. System analysis can be used to represent almost anything from population growth to audio speakers; electrical engineers often use it because of its direct relevance to many areas of their discipline, most notably signal processing, communication systems and control systems.

== Characterization of systems ==
A system is characterized by how it responds to input signals. In general, a system has one or more input signals and one or more output signals. Therefore, one natural characterization of systems is by how many inputs and outputs they have:

- SISO – Single input, single output
- SIMO – Single input, multiple outputs
- MISO – Multiple inputs, single output
- MIMO – Multiple inputs, multiple outputs

It is often useful (or necessary) to break up a system into smaller pieces for analysis. Therefore, we can regard a SIMO system as multiple SISO systems (one for each output), and similarly for a MIMO system. By far, the greatest amount of work in system analysis has been with SISO systems, although many parts inside SISO systems have multiple inputs (such as adders).

Signals can be continuous or discrete in time, as well as continuous or discrete in the values they take at any given time:

- Signals that are continuous in time and continuous in value are known as analog signals.
- Signals that are discrete in time and discrete in value are known as digital signals.
- Signals that are discrete in time and continuous in value are called discrete-time signals. Switched capacitor systems, for instance, are often used in integrated circuits. The methods developed for analyzing discrete time signals and systems are usually applied to digital and analog signals and systems.
- Signals that are continuous in time and discrete in value are sometimes seen in the timing analysis of logic circuits or PWM amplifiers, but have little to no use in system analysis.

With this categorization of signals, a system can then be characterized as to which type of signals it deals with:

- A system that has analog input and analog output is known as an analog system.
- A system that has digital input and digital output is known as a digital system.
- Systems with analog input and digital output or digital input and analog output are possible. However, it is usually easiest to break these systems up for analysis into their analog and digital parts, as well as the necessary analog-to-digital or digital-to-analog converter.

Another way to characterize systems is by whether their output at any given time depends only on the input at that time or perhaps on the input at some time in the past (or in the future!).

- Memoryless systems do not depend on any past input. In common usage memoryless systems are also independent of future inputs. An interesting consequence of this is that the impulse response of any memoryless system is itself a scaled impulse.
- Systems with memory do depend on past input.
- Causal systems do not depend on any future input.
- Non-causal or anticipatory systems do depend on future input.
  Note: It is not possible to physically realize a non-causal system operating in "real time". However, from the standpoint of analysis, they are important for two reasons. First, the ideal system for a given application is often a noncausal system, which although not physically possible can give insight into the design of a derived causal system to accomplish a similar purpose. Second, there are instances when a system does not operate in "real time" but is rather simulated "off-line" by a computer, such as post-processing an audio or video recording.
  Further, some non-causal systems can operate in pseudo-real time by introducing lag: if a system depends on input for 1 second in future, it can process in real time with 1 second lag.

Analog systems with memory may be further classified as lumped or distributed. The difference can be explained by considering the meaning of memory in a system. Future output of a system with memory depends on future input and a number of state variables, such as values of the input or output at various times in the past. If the number of state variables necessary to describe future output is finite, the system is lumped; if it is infinite, the system is distributed.

Finally, systems may be characterized by certain properties which facilitate their analysis:

- A system is linear if it has the superposition and scaling properties. A system that is not linear is non-linear.
- If the output of a system does not depend explicitly on time, the system is said to be time-invariant; otherwise it is time-variant
- A system that will always produce the same output for a given input is said to be deterministic.
- A system that will produce different outputs for a given input is said to be stochastic.

There are many methods of analysis developed specifically for linear time-invariant (LTI) deterministic systems. Unfortunately, in the case of analog systems, none of these properties are ever perfectly achieved. Linearity implies that operation of a system can be scaled to arbitrarily large magnitudes, which is not possible. By definition of time-invariance, it is violated by aging effects that can change the outputs of analog systems over time (usually years or even decades). Thermal noise and other random phenomena ensure that the operation of any analog system will have some degree of stochastic behavior. Despite these limitations, however, it is usually reasonable to assume that deviations from these ideals will be small.

== LTI systems ==
As mentioned above, there are many methods of analysis developed specifically for Linear time-invariant systems (LTI systems). This is due to their simplicity of specification. An LTI system is completely specified by its transfer function (which is a rational function for digital and lumped analog LTI systems). Alternatively, we can think of an LTI system being completely specified by its frequency response. A third way to specify an LTI system is by its characteristic linear differential equation (for analog systems) or linear difference equation (for digital systems). Which description is most useful depends on the application.

The distinction between lumped and distributed LTI systems is important. A lumped LTI system is specified by a finite number of parameters, be it the zeros and poles of its transfer function, or the coefficients of its differential equation, whereas specification of a distributed LTI system requires a complete function, or partial differential equations.

== See also ==
=== Important concepts in system analysis ===
- Linear time-invariant system theory
- Filter theory and Filter design
- Impulse response
  - Infinite impulse response systems
  - Finite impulse response systems
- Step response
- Transforms:
  - Laplace transform
  - Fourier transform: Continuous Fourier transform & Discrete Fourier transform
  - Z-transform
- Transfer function
- Frequency response
- Poles and zeros
- Bode plots
- Minimum phase transfer functions
- Linear phase
- Ordinary differential equations and Difference equations
- Feedback
- Stability
- Causality
- Steady-state and transient behavior
- Limit cycle

=== Related fields ===
- Control system and control theory
- Digital signal processing
- Digital image processing
- Telecommunications
