= Zir =

Zir or ZIR may refer to:

- Zizers or Zir, a municipality in Switzerland
- Zirnitra or Zir, a black dragon in Wendish mythology
- Zero Input Response, a type of response in electrical circuit theory
- Zir or DOCK-C, a type of DOCK protein
- Zir, a proposed English gender-neutral pronoun
