= Linear motion =

Type of motion in which the path of the moving object is a straight line

Linear motion, also called rectilinear motion, is one-dimensional motion along a straight line, and can therefore be described mathematically using only one spatial dimension. The linear motion can be of two types: uniform linear motion, with constant velocity (zero acceleration); and non-uniform linear motion, with variable velocity (non-zero acceleration). The motion of a particle (a point-like object) along a line can be described by its position $x$, which varies with $t$ (time). An example of linear motion is an athlete running a 100-meter dash along a straight track.

Linear motion is the most basic of all motion. According to Newton's first law of motion, objects that do not experience any net force will continue to move in a straight line with a constant velocity until they are subjected to a net force. Under everyday circumstances, external forces such as gravity and friction can cause an object to change the direction of its motion, so that its motion cannot be described as linear.

One may compare linear motion to general motion. In general motion, a particle's position and velocity are described by vectors, which have a magnitude and direction. In linear motion, the directions of all the vectors describing the system are equal and constant which means the objects move along the same axis and do not change direction. The analysis of such systems may therefore be simplified by neglecting the direction components of the vectors involved and dealing only with the magnitude.

== Background ==
=== Displacement ===
The motion in which all the particles of a body move through the same distance in the same time is called translatory motion. There are two types of translatory motions: rectilinear motion; curvilinear motion. Since linear motion is a motion in a single dimension, the distance traveled by an object in particular direction is the same as displacement. The SI unit of displacement is the metre. If $x_1$ is the initial position of an object and $x_2$ is the final position, then mathematically the displacement is given by:
$$\Delta x = x_2 - x_1$$

The equivalent of displacement in rotational motion is the angular displacement $\theta$ measured in radians. The displacement of an object cannot be greater than the distance because it is also a distance but the shortest one. Consider a person travelling to work daily. Overall displacement when he returns home is zero, since the person ends up back where he started, but the distance travelled is clearly not zero.

=== Velocity ===
Velocity refers to a displacement in one direction with respect to an interval of time. It is defined as the rate of change of displacement over change in time. Velocity is a vector quantity, representing a direction and a magnitude of movement. The magnitude of a velocity is called speed. The SI unit of speed is $\text{m}\cdot \text{s}^{-1},$ that is metre per second.

==== Average velocity ====
The average velocity of a moving body is its total displacement divided by the total time needed to travel from the initial point to the final point. It is an estimated velocity for a distance to travel. Mathematically, it is given by:

$$\mathbf{v}_\text{avg}
= \frac {\Delta \mathbf{x}}{\Delta t}
= \frac {\mathbf{x}_2 - \mathbf{x}_1}{t_2 - t_1}$$

where:

- $t_1$ is the time at which the object was at position $\mathbf{x}_1$ and
- $t_2$ is the time at which the object was at position $\mathbf{x}_2$

The magnitude of the average velocity $\left|\mathbf{v}_\text{avg}\right|$ is called an average speed.

==== Instantaneous velocity ====
In contrast to an average velocity, referring to the overall motion in a finite time interval, the instantaneous velocity of an object describes the state of motion at a specific point in time. It is defined by letting the length of the time interval $\Delta t$ tend to zero, that is, the velocity is the time derivative of the displacement as a function of time.

$$\mathbf{v} = \lim_{\Delta t \to 0} \frac{\Delta \mathbf{x}}{\Delta t} = \frac {d\mathbf{x}}{dt}.$$

The magnitude of the instantaneous velocity $|\mathbf{v}|$ is called the instantaneous speed. The instantaneous velocity equation comes from finding the limit as t approaches 0 of the average velocity. The instantaneous velocity shows the position function with respect to time. From the instantaneous velocity the instantaneous speed can be derived by getting the magnitude of the instantaneous velocity.

=== Acceleration ===
Acceleration is defined as the rate of change of velocity with respect to time. Acceleration is the second derivative of displacement i.e. acceleration can be found by differentiating position with respect to time twice or differentiating velocity with respect to time once. The SI unit of acceleration is $\mathrm{m \cdot s^{-2}}$ or metre per second squared.

If $\mathbf{a}_\text{avg}$ is the average acceleration and $\Delta \mathbf{v} = \mathbf{v}_2 - \mathbf{v}_1$ is the change in velocity over the time interval $\Delta t$ then mathematically,
$$\mathbf{a}_\text{avg}
= \frac {\Delta \mathbf{v}}{\Delta t}
= \frac {\mathbf{v}_2 - \mathbf{v}_1}{t_2 - t_1}$$

The instantaneous acceleration is the limit, as $\Delta t$ approaches zero, of the ratio $\Delta \mathbf{v}$ and $\Delta t$, i.e.,
$$\mathbf{a} = \lim_{\Delta t \to 0} \frac{\Delta \mathbf{v}}{\Delta t}
= \frac {d\mathbf{v}}{dt}
= \frac {d^2\mathbf{x}}{dt^2}$$

=== Jerk ===
The rate of change of acceleration, the third derivative of displacement is known as jerk. The SI unit of jerk is $\mathrm{m \cdot s^{-3}}$. In the UK jerk is also referred to as jolt.

=== Jounce ===
The rate of change of jerk, the fourth derivative of displacement is known as jounce. The SI unit of jounce is $\mathrm{m \cdot s^{-4}}$ which can be pronounced as metres per quartic second.

== Formulation ==
In case of constant acceleration, the four physical quantities acceleration, velocity, time and displacement can be related by using the equations of motion.

$$\mathbf{v}_\text{f} = \mathbf{v}_\text{i}+\mathbf{a}t$$

$$\mathbf{d} = \mathbf{v}_\text{i}t + \frac{1}{2}\mathbf{a}t^2$$

$$\mathbf{v}^2_\text{f} = \mathbf{v}^2_\text{i} + 2\mathbf{ad}$$

$$\mathbf{d} = \frac{t}{2} \left ( \mathbf{v}_\text{f} + \mathbf{v}_\text{i} \right )$$

Here,

- $\mathbf{v}_\text{i}$ is the initial velocity
- $\mathbf{v}_\text{f}$ is the final velocity
- $\mathbf{a}$ is acceleration
- $\mathbf{d}$ is displacement
- $t$ is time

These relationships can be demonstrated graphically. The gradient of a line on a displacement time graph represents the velocity. The gradient of the velocity time graph gives the acceleration while the area under the velocity time graph gives the displacement. The area under a graph of acceleration versus time is equal to the change in velocity.

== Comparison to rotational motion ==
The following table refers to rotation of a rigid body about a fixed axis: $\mathbf s$ is arc length, $\mathbf r$ is the distance from the axis to any point, and $\mathbf{a}_\mathbf{t}$ is the tangential acceleration, which is the component of the acceleration that is parallel to the motion. In contrast, the centripetal acceleration, $\mathbf{a}_\mathbf{c} = v^2/r = \omega^2 r$, is perpendicular to the motion. The component of the force parallel to the motion, or equivalently, perpendicular to the line connecting the point of application to the axis is $\mathbf{F}_\perp$. The sum is over $j$ from $1$ to $N$ particles and/or points of application.

Analogy between Linear Motion and Rotational motion
Linear motion	Rotational motion	Defining equation
Displacement = $\mathbf{x}$	Angular displacement = $\theta$	$\theta = \mathbf{s}/\mathbf{r}$
Velocity = $\mathbf{v}$	Angular velocity = $\omega$	$\omega= \mathbf{v}/\mathbf{r}$
Acceleration = $\mathbf{a}$	Angular acceleration = $\alpha$	$\alpha= \mathbf{a_\mathbf{t}}/\mathbf{r}$
Mass = $\mathbf{m}$	Moment of Inertia = $\mathbf{I}$	$\mathbf{I} = \sum_j \mathbf{m}_j \mathbf{r}_j^2$
Force = $\mathbf{F} = \mathbf{m} \mathbf{a}$	Torque = $\tau = \mathbf{I} \alpha$	$\tau = \sum_j \mathbf{r}_j \mathbf{F}_{\perp j}$
Momentum= $\mathbf{p} = \mathbf{m} \mathbf{v}$	Angular momentum= $\mathbf L = \mathbf{I} \omega$	$\mathbf L = \sum_j \mathbf{r}_j\mathbf{p}_j$
Kinetic energy = $\frac 1 2\mathbf{m} \mathbf{v}^2$	Kinetic energy = $\frac 1 2\mathbf{I} \omega^2$	$\frac 1 2 \sum_j \mathbf{m}_j \mathbf{v}_j^2 = \frac 1 2 \sum_j \mathbf{m}_j \mathbf{r}_j^2 \omega^2$

The following table shows the analogy in derived SI units:

Linear/translational quantities				Angular/rotational quantities			
Dimensions	1	L	L^{2}	Dimensions	1	θ	θ^{2}
T	time: t s	absement: A m s		T	time: t s		
1		distance: d, position: r, s, x, displacement: d m	area: A m^{2}	1		angle: θ, angular displacement: θ rad	solid angle: Ω rad^{2}, sr
T^{−1}	frequency: f s^{−1}, Hz	speed: v, velocity: v m s^{−1}	kinematic viscosity: ν, specific angular momentum: h m^{2} s^{−1}	T^{−1}	frequency: f, rotational speed: n, rotational velocity: n s^{−1}, Hz	angular speed: ω, angular velocity: ω rad s^{−1}	
T^{−2}		acceleration: a m s^{−2}		T^{−2}	rotational acceleration s^{−2}	angular acceleration: α rad s^{−2}	
T^{−3}		jerk: j m s^{−3}		T^{−3}		angular jerk: ζ rad s^{−3}	
M	mass: m kg	weighted position: M ⟨x⟩ = ∑ m x	moment of inertia: I kg m^{2}	ML			
MT^{−1}	Mass flow rate: $\dot{m}$ kg s^{−1}	momentum: p, impulse: J kg m s^{−1}, N s	action: 𝒮, actergy: ℵ kg m^{2} s^{−1}, J s	MLT^{−1}		angular momentum: L, angular impulse: ΔL kg m rad s^{−1}	
MT^{−2}		force: F, weight: F_{g} kg m s^{−2}, N	energy: E, work: W, Lagrangian: L kg m^{2} s^{−2}, J	MLT^{−2}		torque: τ, moment: M kg m rad s^{−2}, N m	
MT^{−3}		yank: Y kg m s^{−3}, N s^{−1}	power: P kg m^{2} s^{−3}, W	MLT^{−3}		rotatum: P kg m rad s^{−3}, N m s^{−1}	

== See also ==
- Angular motion
- Centripetal force
- Inertial frame of reference
- Linear actuator
- Linear bearing
- Linear motor
- Motion graphs and derivatives
- Reciprocating motion
- Rectilinear propagation
- Uniformly accelerated linear motion
