= Liyi Dai =

American-Chinese engineer

Liyi Dai is an electrical engineer from the United States Army Research Office in Durham, North Carolina. Dai was named a Fellow of the Institute of Electrical and Electronics Engineers (IEEE) in 2014 for his contributions to discrete event systems and singular systems.
