= Time-variant system =

System whose output depends on moment of observation and input signal application

A time-variant system is a system whose output response depends on moment of observation as well as moment of input signal application. In other words, a time delay or time advance of input not only shifts the output signal in time but also changes other parameters and behavior. Time variant systems respond differently to the same input at different times. The opposite is true for time invariant systems (TIV).

== Overview ==
There are many well developed techniques for dealing with the response of linear time invariant systems, such as Laplace and Fourier transforms. However, these techniques are not strictly valid for time-varying systems. A system undergoing slow time variation in comparison to its time constants can usually be considered to be time invariant: they are close to time invariant on a small scale. An example of this is the aging and wear of electronic components, which happens on a scale of years, and thus does not result in any behaviour qualitatively different from that observed in a time invariant system: day-to-day, they are effectively time invariant, though year to year, the parameters may change. Other linear time variant systems may behave more like nonlinear systems, if the system changes quickly – significantly differing between measurements.

The following things can be said about a time-variant system:

- It has explicit dependence on time.
- It does not have an impulse response in the normal sense. The system can be characterized by an impulse response except the impulse response must be known at each and every time instant.
- It is not stationary in the sense of constancy of the signal's distributional frequency. This means that the parameters which govern the signal's process exhibit variation with the passage of time. See Stationarity (statistics) for in-depth theoretics regarding this property.

== Linear time-variant systems ==
Linear-time variant (LTV) systems are the ones whose parameters vary with time according to previously specified laws. Mathematically, there is a well defined dependence of the system over time and over the input parameters that change over time.

$$y(t) = f ( x(t), t)$$

In order to solve time-variant systems, the algebraic methods consider initial conditions of the system i.e. whether the system is zero-input or non-zero input system.

== Examples of time-variant systems ==
The following time varying systems cannot be modelled by assuming that they are time invariant:

- The Earth's thermodynamic response to incoming Solar irradiance varies with time due to changes in the Earth's albedo and the presence of greenhouse gases in the atmosphere.
- Discrete wavelet transform, often used in modern signal processing, is time variant because it makes use of the decimation operation.

== See also ==
- Control system
- Control theory
- System analysis
- Time-invariant system
