= Linear control =

Control systems and control theory based on negative feedback

Linear control are control systems and control theory based on negative feedback for producing a control signal to maintain the controlled process variable (PV) at the desired setpoint (SP). There are several types of linear control systems with different capabilities.

== Proportional control ==
Step responses for a second order system defined by the transfer function $H(s)=\frac{\omega^2_n}{s^2+2\zeta\omega_ns+\omega^2_n}$, where $\zeta$ is the damping ratio and $\omega_n$ is the undamped natural frequency

Proportional control is a type of linear feedback control system in which a correction is applied to the controlled variable which is proportional to the difference between the desired value (SP) and the measured value (PV). Two classic mechanical examples are the toilet bowl float proportioning valve and the fly-ball governor.

The proportional control system is more complex than an on–off control system but simpler than a proportional-integral-derivative (PID) control system used, for instance, in an automobile cruise control. On–off control will work for systems that do not require high accuracy or responsiveness but are not effective for rapid and timely corrections and responses. Proportional control overcomes this by modulating the manipulated variable (MV), such as a control valve, at a gain level that avoids instability, but applies correction as fast as practicable by applying the optimum quantity of proportional correction.

A drawback of proportional control is that it cannot eliminate the residual SP–PV error, as it requires an error to generate a proportional output. A PI controller can be used to overcome this. The PI controller uses a proportional term (P) to remove the gross error, and an integral term (I) to eliminate the residual offset error by integrating the error over time.

In some systems, there are practical limits to the range of the MV. For example, a heater has a limit to how much heat it can produce and a valve can open only so far. Adjustments to the gain simultaneously alter the range of error values over which the MV is between these limits. The width of this range, in units of the error variable and therefore of the PV, is called the proportional band (PB).

=== Furnace example ===
When controlling the temperature of an industrial furnace, it is usually better to control the opening of the fuel valve in proportion to the current needs of the furnace. This helps avoid thermal shocks and applies heat more effectively.

At low gains, only a small corrective action is applied when errors are detected. The system may be safe and stable but may be sluggish in response to changing conditions. Errors will remain uncorrected for relatively long periods of time and the system is overdamped. If the proportional gain is increased, such systems become more responsive and errors are dealt with more quickly. There is an optimal value for the gain setting when the overall system is said to be critically damped. Increases in loop gain beyond this point lead to oscillations in the PV and such a system is underdamped. Adjusting gain to achieve critically damped behavior is known as tuning the control system.

In the underdamped case, the furnace heats quickly. Once the setpoint is reached, stored heat within the heater sub-system and in the walls of the furnace will keep the measured temperature rising beyond what is required. After rising above the setpoint, the temperature falls back and eventually heat is applied again. Any delay in reheating the heater sub-system allows the furnace temperature to fall further below the setpoint and the cycle repeats. The temperature oscillations that an underdamped furnace control system produces are undesirable.

In a critically damped system, as the temperature approaches the setpoint, the heat input begins to be reduced, the rate of heating of the furnace has time to slow and the system avoids overshoot. Overshoot is also avoided in an overdamped system but an overdamped system is unnecessarily slow to initially reach a setpoint response to external changes to the system, e.g. opening the furnace door.

== PID control ==
A block diagram of a PID controller

Effects of varying PID parameters (K_{p},K_{i},K_{d}) on the step response of a system

Pure proportional controllers must operate with residual error in the system. Though PI controllers eliminate this error they can still be sluggish or produce oscillations. The PID controller addresses these final shortcomings by introducing a derivative (D) action to retain stability while responsiveness is improved.

=== Derivative action ===
The derivative is concerned with the rate-of-change of the error with time: If the measured variable approaches the setpoint rapidly, then the actuator is backed off early to allow it to coast to the required level; conversely, if the measured value begins to move rapidly away from the setpoint, extra effort is applied—in proportion to that rapidity to help move it back.

On control systems involving motion control of a heavy item like a gun or camera on a moving vehicle, the derivative action of a well-tuned PID controller can allow it to reach and maintain a setpoint better than most skilled human operators. If a derivative action is over-applied, it can, however, lead to oscillations.

=== Integral action ===
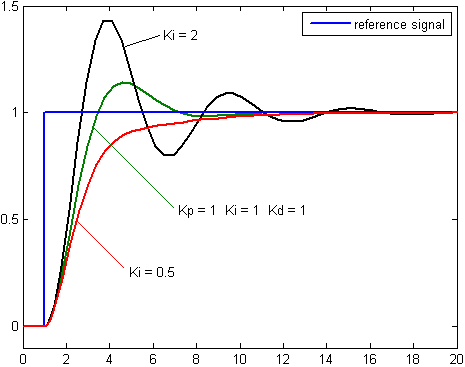
Change of response of a second-order system to a step input for varying Ki values

The integral term magnifies the effect of long-term steady-state errors, applying an ever-increasing effort until the error is removed. In the example of the furnace above working at various temperatures, if the heat being applied does not bring the furnace up to setpoint, for whatever reason, integral action increasingly moves the proportional band relative to the setpoint until the PV error is reduced to zero and the setpoint is achieved.

=== Ramp up % per minute ===
Some controllers include the option to limit the "ramp up % per minute". This option can be very helpful in stabilizing small boilers (3 MBTUH), especially during the summer, during light loads. A utility boiler "unit may be required to change load at a rate of as much as 5% per minute (IEA Coal Online - 2, 2007)".

== Other techniques ==
It is possible to filter the PV or error signal. Doing so can help reduce instability or oscillations by reducing the response of the system to undesirable frequencies. Many systems have a resonant frequency. By filtering out that frequency, stronger overall feedback can be applied before oscillation occurs, making the system more responsive without shaking itself apart.

Feedback systems can be combined. In cascade control, one control loop applies control algorithms to a measured variable against a setpoint but then provides a varying setpoint to another control loop rather than affecting process variables directly. If a system has several different measured variables to be controlled, separate control systems will be present for each of them.

Control engineering in many applications produces control systems that are more complex than PID control. Examples of such field applications include fly-by-wire aircraft control systems, chemical plants, and oil refineries. Model predictive control systems are designed using specialized computer-aided-design software and empirical mathematical models of the system to be controlled.

== See also ==
- Linear system
  - Linear time-invariant system
- Nonlinear control
