= Shift-invariant system =

Discrete equivalent to a time-invariant system

In signal processing, a shift invariant system is the discrete equivalent of a time-invariant system, defined such that if $y(n)$ is the response of the system to $x(n)$, then $y(n-k)$ is the response of the system to $x(n-k)$. That is, in a shift-invariant system, the contemporaneous response of the output variable to a given value of the input variable does not depend on when the input occurs; time shifts are irrelevant in this regard.

== Applications ==
Because digital systems need not be causal, some operations can be implemented in the digital domain that cannot be implemented using discrete analog components. Digital filters that require finite numbers of future values can be implemented while the analog counterparts cannot.

== See also ==
- LTI system theory
