= Time-invariant system =

Dynamical system whose system function is not directly dependent on time

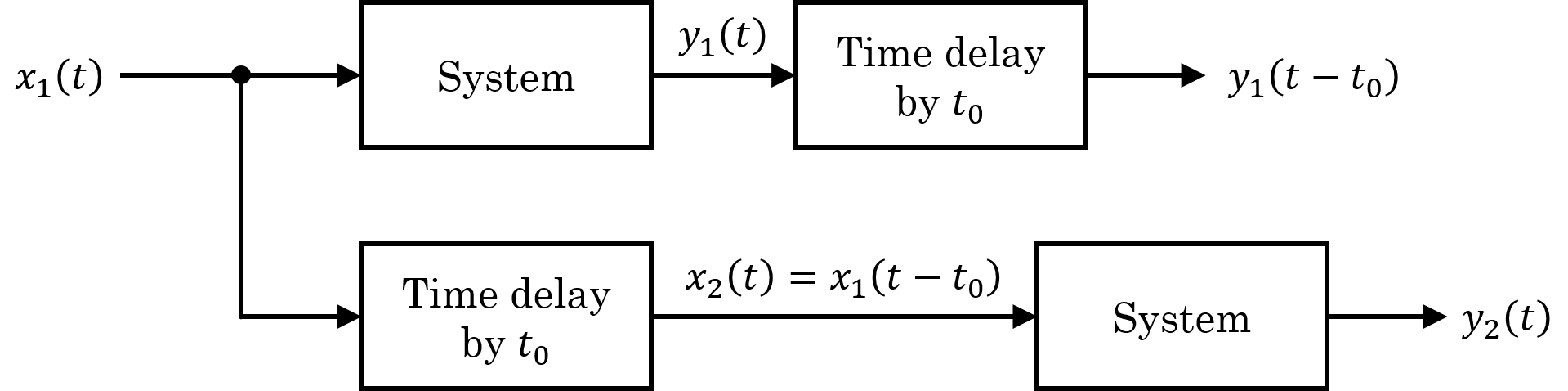
Block diagram illustrating the time invariance for a deterministic continuous-time single-input single-output system. The system is time-invariant if and only if y_{2}(t) = y_{1}(t – t_{0}) for all time t, for all real constant t_{0} and for all input x_{1}(t). Click image to expand it.

In control theory, a time-invariant (TI) system has a time-dependent system function that is not a direct function of time. Such systems are regarded as a class of systems in the field of system analysis. The time-dependent system function is a function of the time-dependent input function. If this function depends only indirectly on the time-domain (via the input function, for example), then that is a system that would be considered time-invariant. Conversely, any direct dependence on the time-domain of the system function could be considered as a "time-varying system".

Mathematically speaking, "time-invariance" of a system is the following property:

Given a system with a time-dependent output function $y(t)$, and a time-dependent input function $x(t)$, the system will be considered time-invariant if a time-delay on the input $x(t+\delta)$ directly equates to a time-delay of the output $y(t+\delta)$ function. For example, if time $t$ is "elapsed time", then "time-invariance" implies that the relationship between the input function $x(t)$ and the output function $y(t)$ is constant with respect to time $t:$

$$y(t) = f( x(t), t ) = f( x(t)).$$

In the language of signal processing, this property can be satisfied if the transfer function of the system is not a direct function of time except as expressed by the input and output.

In the context of a system schematic, this property can also be stated as follows, as shown in the figure to the right:

If a system is time-invariant then the system block commutes with an arbitrary delay.

If a time-invariant system is also linear, it is the subject of linear time-invariant theory (linear time-invariant) with direct applications in NMR spectroscopy, seismology, circuits, signal processing, control theory, and other technical areas. Nonlinear time-invariant systems lack a comprehensive, governing theory. Discrete time-invariant systems are known as shift-invariant systems. Systems which lack the time-invariant property are studied as time-variant systems.

== Simple example ==
To demonstrate how to determine if a system is time-invariant, consider the two systems:

- System A: $y(t) = t x(t)$
- System B: $y(t) = 10 x(t)$

Since the System Function $y(t)$ for system A explicitly depends on t outside of $x(t)$, it is not time-invariant because the time-dependence is not explicitly a function of the input function.

In contrast, system B's time-dependence is only a function of the time-varying input $x(t)$. This makes system B time-invariant.

The Formal Example below shows in more detail that while System B is a Shift-Invariant System as a function of time, t, System A is not.

== Formal example ==
A more formal proof of why systems A and B above differ is now presented. To perform this proof, the second definition will be used.

System A: Start with a delay of the input $x_d(t) = x(t + \delta)$

$$y(t) = t x(t)$$
$$y_1(t) = t x_d(t) = t x(t + \delta)$$

Now delay the output by $\delta$

$$y(t) = t x(t)$$
$$y_2(t) = y(t + \delta) = (t + \delta) x(t + \delta)$$

Clearly $y_1(t) \ne y_2(t)$, therefore the system is not time-invariant.

System B: Start with a delay of the input $x_d(t) = x(t + \delta)$

$$y(t) = 10 x(t)$$
$$y_1(t) = 10 x_d(t) = 10 x(t + \delta)$$

Now delay the output by $\delta$

$$y(t) = 10 x(t)$$
$$y_2(t) = y(t + \delta) = 10 x(t + \delta)$$

Clearly $y_1(t) = y_2(t)$, therefore the system is time-invariant.

More generally, the relationship between the input and output is

$$y(t) = f(x(t), t),$$

and its variation with time is

$$\frac{\mathrm{d} y}{\mathrm{d} t} = \frac{\partial f}{\partial t} + \frac{\partial f}{\partial x} \frac{\mathrm{d} x}{\mathrm{d} t}.$$

For time-invariant systems, the system properties remain constant with time,

$$\frac{\partial f}{\partial t} =0.$$

Applied to Systems A and B above:

$f_A = t x(t) \qquad \implies \qquad \frac{\partial f_A}{\partial t} = x(t) \neq 0$ in general, so it is not time-invariant,
$f_B = 10 x(t) \qquad \implies \qquad \frac{\partial f_B}{\partial t} = 0$ so it is time-invariant.

== Abstract example ==
We can denote the shift operator by $\mathbb{T}_r$ where $r$ is the amount by which a vector's index set should be shifted. For example, the "advance-by-1" system

$$x(t+1) = \delta(t+1) * x(t)$$

can be represented in this abstract notation by

$$\tilde{x}_1 = \mathbb{T}_1 \tilde{x}$$

where $\tilde{x}$ is a function given by

$$\tilde{x} = x(t) \forall t \in \R$$

with the system yielding the shifted output

$$\tilde{x}_1 = x(t + 1) \forall t \in \R$$

So $\mathbb{T}_1$ is an operator that advances the input vector by 1.

Suppose we represent a system by an operator $\mathbb{H}$. This system is time-invariant if it commutes with the shift operator, i.e.,

$$\mathbb{T}_r \mathbb{H} = \mathbb{H} \mathbb{T}_r \forall r$$

If our system equation is given by

$$\tilde{y} = \mathbb{H} \tilde{x}$$

then it is time-invariant if we can apply the system operator $\mathbb{H}$ on $\tilde{x}$ followed by the shift operator $\mathbb{T}_r$, or we can apply the shift operator $\mathbb{T}_r$ followed by the system operator $\mathbb{H}$, with the two computations yielding equivalent results.

Applying the system operator first gives

$$\mathbb{T}_r \mathbb{H} \tilde{x} = \mathbb{T}_r \tilde{y} = \tilde{y}_r$$

Applying the shift operator first gives

$$\mathbb{H} \mathbb{T}_r \tilde{x} = \mathbb{H} \tilde{x}_r$$

If the system is time-invariant, then

$$\mathbb{H} \tilde{x}_r = \tilde{y}_r$$

== See also ==
- Finite impulse response
- Sheffer sequence
- State space (controls)
- Signal-flow graph
- LTI system theory
- Autonomous system (mathematics)
