= Discrete time and continuous time =

Frameworks for modeling variables that evolve over time

In mathematical dynamics, discrete time and continuous time are two alternative frameworks within which variables that evolve over time are modeled.

== Discrete time ==
Discrete sampled signal

Discrete time views values of variables as occurring at distinct, separate "points in time", or equivalently as being unchanged throughout each non-zero region of time ("time period")—that is, time is viewed as a discrete variable. Thus a non-time variable jumps from one value to another as time moves from one time period to the next. This view of time corresponds to a digital clock that gives a fixed reading of 10:37 for a while, and then jumps to a new fixed reading of 10:38, etc. In this framework, each variable of interest is measured once at each time period. The number of measurements between any two time periods is finite. Measurements are typically made at sequential integer values of the variable "time".

A discrete signal or discrete-time signal is a time series consisting of a sequence of quantities.

Unlike a continuous-time signal, a discrete-time signal is not a function of a continuous argument; however, it may have been obtained by sampling from a continuous-time signal. When a discrete-time signal is obtained by sampling a sequence at uniformly spaced times, it has an associated sampling rate.

Discrete-time signals may have several origins, but can usually be classified into one of two groups:

- By acquiring values of an analog signal at constant or variable rate. This process is called sampling.
- By observing an inherently discrete-time process, such as the weekly peak value of a particular economic indicator.

== Continuous time ==
In contrast, continuous time views variables as having a particular value only for an infinitesimally short amount of time. Between any two points in time there are an infinite number of other points in time. The variable "time" ranges over the entire real number line, or depending on the context, over some subset of it such as the non-negative reals. Thus time is viewed as a continuous variable.

A continuous signal or a continuous-time signal is a varying quantity (a signal) whose domain, which is often time, is a continuum (e.g., a connected interval of the reals). That is, the function's domain is an uncountable set. The function itself need not to be continuous. To contrast, a discrete-time signal has a countable domain, like the natural numbers.

A signal of continuous amplitude and time is known as a continuous-time signal or an analog signal. This (a signal) will have some value at every instant of time. The electrical signals derived in proportion with the physical quantities such as temperature, pressure, sound etc. are generally continuous signals. Other examples of continuous signals are sine wave, cosine wave, triangular wave etc.

The signal is defined over a domain, which may or may not be finite, and there is a functional mapping from the domain to the value of the signal. The continuity of the time variable, in connection with the law of density of real numbers, means that the signal value can be found at any arbitrary point in time.

A typical example of an infinite duration signal is:

$$f(t) = \sin(t), \quad t \in \mathbb{R}$$

A finite duration counterpart of the above signal could be:

$f(t) = \sin(t), \quad t \in [-\pi,\pi]$ and $f(t) = 0$ otherwise.

The value of a finite (or infinite) duration signal may or may not be finite. For example,

$f(t) = \frac{1}{t}, \quad t \in [0,1]$ and $f(t) = 0$ otherwise,

is a finite duration signal but it takes an infinite value for $t = 0\,$.

In many disciplines, the convention is that a continuous signal must always have a finite value, which makes more sense in the case of physical signals.

For some purposes, infinite singularities are acceptable as long as the signal is integrable over any finite interval (for example, the $t^{-1}$ signal is not integrable at infinity, but $t^{-2}$ is).

Any analog signal is continuous by nature. Discrete-time signals, used in digital signal processing, can be obtained by sampling and quantization of continuous signals.

Continuous signal may also be defined over an independent variable other than time. Another very common independent variable is space and is particularly useful in image processing, where two space dimensions are used.

== Relevant contexts ==
Discrete time is often employed when empirical measurements are involved, because normally it is only possible to measure variables sequentially. For example, while economic activity actually occurs continuously, there being no moment when the economy is totally in a pause, it is only possible to measure economic activity discretely. For this reason, published data on, for example, gross domestic product will show a sequence of quarterly values.

When one attempts to empirically explain such variables in terms of other variables and/or their own prior values, one uses time series or regression methods in which variables are indexed with a subscript indicating the time period in which the observation occurred. For example, y_{t} might refer to the value of income observed in unspecified time period t, y_{3} to the value of income observed in the third time period, etc.

Moreover, when a researcher attempts to develop a theory to explain what is observed in discrete time, often the theory itself is expressed in discrete time in order to facilitate the development of a time series or regression model.

On the other hand, it is often more mathematically tractable to construct theoretical models in continuous time, and often in areas such as physics an exact description requires the use of continuous time. In a continuous time context, the value of a variable y at an unspecified point in time is denoted as y(t) or, when the meaning is clear, simply as y.

== Types of equations ==
=== Discrete time ===
Discrete time makes use of difference equations, also known as recurrence relations. An example, known as the logistic map or logistic equation, is

$$x_{t+1} = rx_t(1-x_t),$$

in which r is a parameter in the range from 2 to 4 inclusive, and x is a variable in the range from 0 to 1 inclusive whose value in period t nonlinearly affects its value in the next period, t + 1. For example, if $r=4$ and $x_1 = 1/3$, then for t = 1 we have $x_2=4(1/3)(2/3)=8/9$, and for t = 2 we have $x_3=4(8/9)(1/9)=32/81$.

Another example models the adjustment of a price P in response to non-zero excess demand for a product as

$$P_{t+1} = P_t + \delta \cdot f(P_t,...) ,$$

where $\delta$ is the positive speed-of-adjustment parameter which is less than or equal to 1, and where $f$ is the excess demand function.

=== Continuous time ===
Continuous time makes use of differential equations. For example, the adjustment of a price P in response to non-zero excess demand for a product can be modeled in continuous time as

$$\frac{dP}{dt}=\lambda \cdot f(P,...) ,$$

where the left side is the first derivative of the price with respect to time (that is, the rate of change of the price), $\lambda$ is the speed-of-adjustment parameter which can be any positive finite number, and $f$ is again the excess demand function.

== Graphical depiction ==
A variable measured in discrete time can be plotted as a step function, in which each time period is given a region on the horizontal axis of the same length as every other time period, and the measured variable is plotted as a height that stays constant throughout the region of the time period. In this graphical technique, the graph appears as a sequence of horizontal steps. Alternatively, each time period can be viewed as a detached point in time, usually at an integer value on the horizontal axis, and the measured variable is plotted as a height above that time-axis point. In this technique, the graph appears as a set of dots.

The values of a variable measured in continuous time are plotted as a continuous function, since the domain of time is considered to be the entire real axis or at least some connected portion of it.

== See also ==
- Aliasing
- Bernoulli process
- Digital data
- Discrete calculus
- Discrete system
- Discretization
- Normalized frequency
- Nyquist–Shannon sampling theorem
- Time-scale calculus
