= Ping test (engineering) =

A ping test is a physical test to determine the natural frequency of an object or assembly. The test consists of instrumenting the object or assembly with measuring devices and then tapping it with another metallic object (usually a hammer.) The undamped system will then vibrate at its natural frequency. The ping test is used on assemblies and objects where vibration can be an issue.

== See also ==
- Ping
