= Rise time =

Time taken by a signal to change to a high value

In electronics, when describing a voltage or current step function, rise time is the time taken by a signal to change from a specified low value to a specified high value. These values may be expressed as ratios or, equivalently, as percentages with respect to a given reference value. In analog electronics and digital electronics, these percentages are commonly the 10% and 90% (or equivalently 0.1 and 0.9) of the output step height: however, other values are commonly used. For applications in control theory, according to Levine (1996, p. 158), rise time is defined as "the time required for the response to rise from x% to y% of its final value", with 0% to 100% rise time common for underdamped second order systems, 5% to 95% for critically damped and 10% to 90% for overdamped ones.

Similarly, fall time (pulse decay time) $t_f$ is the time taken for the amplitude of a pulse to decrease (fall) from a specified value (usually 90% of the peak value exclusive of overshoot or undershoot) to another specified value (usually 10% of the maximum value exclusive of overshoot or undershoot). Limits on undershoot and oscillation (also known as ringing and hunting) are sometimes additionally stated when specifying fall time limits.

According to Orwiler (1969, p. 22), the term "rise time" applies to either positive or negative step response, even if a displayed negative excursion is popularly termed fall time.

== Overview ==
Rise time is an analog parameter of fundamental importance in high speed electronics, since it is a measure of the ability of a circuit to respond to fast input signals. There have been many efforts to reduce the rise times of circuits, generators, and data measuring and transmission equipment. These reductions tend to stem from research on faster electron devices and from techniques of reduction in stray circuit parameters (mainly capacitances and inductances). For applications outside the realm of high speed electronics, long (compared to the attainable state of the art) rise times are sometimes desirable: examples are the dimming of a light, where a longer rise-time results, amongst other things, in a longer life for the bulb, or in the control of analog signals by digital ones by means of an analog switch, where a longer rise time means lower capacitive feedthrough, and thus lower coupling noise to the controlled analog signal lines.

=== Factors affecting rise time ===
For a given system output, its rise time depends both on the rise time of input signal and on the characteristics of the system.

For example, rise time values in a resistive circuit are primarily due to stray capacitance and inductance. Since every circuit has not only resistance, but also capacitance and inductance, a delay in voltage and/or current at the load is apparent until the steady state is reached. In a pure RC circuit, the output risetime (10% to 90%) is approximately equal to 2.2 RC.

=== Alternative definitions ===
Other definitions of rise time, apart from the one given by the Federal Standard 1037C (1997, p. R-22) and its slight generalization given by Levine (1996, p. 158), are occasionally used: these alternative definitions differ from the standard not only for the reference levels considered. For example, the time interval graphically corresponding to the intercept points of the tangent drawn through the 50% point of the step function response is occasionally used. Another definition, introduced by Elmore (1948, p. 57), uses concepts from statistics and probability theory. Considering a step response V(t), Elmore redefines the delay time t_{D} as the first moment of its first derivative V′(t), i.e.

$$t_D = \frac{\int_0^{+\infty}t V^\prime(t) \, \mathrm{d}t}{\int_0^{+\infty} V^\prime(t) \, \mathrm{d}t}.$$

Finally, he defines the rise time t_{r} by using the second moment

$$t_r^2 = \frac{\int_0^{+\infty}(t -t_D)^2 V^\prime(t) \, \mathrm{d}t}{\int_0^{+\infty} V^\prime(t) \, \mathrm{d}t} \quad
\Longleftrightarrow \quad t_r =\sqrt{\frac{\int_0^{+\infty}(t -t_D)^2 V^\prime(t) \, \mathrm{d}t}{\int_0^{+\infty} V^\prime(t) \, \mathrm{d}t}}$$

== Rise time of model systems ==
=== Notation ===
All notations and assumptions required for the analysis are listed here.

- Following Levine (1996, p. 158, 2011, 9-3 (313)), we define x% as the percentage low value and y% the percentage high value respect to a reference value of the signal whose rise time is to be estimated.
- t_{1} is the time at which the output of the system under analysis is at the x% of the steady-state value, while t_{2} the one at which it is at the y%, both measured in seconds.
- t_{r} is the rise time of the analysed system, measured in seconds. By definition,
  $$t_r = t_2 - t_1.$$
- f_{L} is the lower cutoff frequency (-3 dB point) of the analysed system, measured in hertz.
- f_{H} is higher cutoff frequency (-3 dB point) of the analysed system, measured in hertz.
- h(t) is the impulse response of the analysed system in the time domain.
- H(ω) is the frequency response of the analysed system in the frequency domain.
- The bandwidth is defined as
  $$BW = f_{H} - f_{L}$$
  and since the lower cutoff frequency f_{L} is usually several decades lower than the higher cutoff frequency f_{H},
  $$BW\cong f_H$$
- All systems analyzed here have a frequency response which extends to 0 (low-pass systems), thus
  $$f_L=0\,\Longleftrightarrow\,f_H=BW$$
  exactly.
- For the sake of simplicity, all systems analysed in the "Simple examples of calculation of rise time" section are unity gain electrical networks, and all signals are thought as voltages: the input is a step function of V_{0} volts, and this implies that
  $$\frac{V(t_1)}{V_0}=\frac{x\%}{100} \qquad \frac{V(t_2)}{V_0}=\frac{y\%}{100}$$
- ζ is the damping ratio and ω_{0} is the natural frequency of a given second order system.

=== Simple examples of calculation of rise time ===
The aim of this section is the calculation of rise time of step response for some simple systems:

==== Gaussian response system ====
A system is said to have a Gaussian response if it is characterized by the following frequency response

$$|H(\omega)|=e^{-\omega^2/\sigma^2}$$

where σ > 0 is a constant, related to the high cutoff frequency by the following relation:

$$f_H = \frac{\sigma}{2\pi} \sqrt{\frac{3}{20}\ln 10} \cong 0.0935 \sigma.$$

Even if this kind of frequency response is not realizable by a causal filter, its usefulness lies in the fact that behaviour of a cascade connection of first order low pass filters approaches the behaviour of this system more closely as the number of cascaded stages asymptotically rises to infinity. The corresponding impulse response can be calculated using the inverse Fourier transform of the shown frequency response

$$\mathcal{F}^{-1}\{H\}(t)=h(t)=\frac{1}{2\pi}\int\limits_{-\infty}^{+\infty} {e^{-\omega^2/\sigma^2} e^{i\omega t}} \,  d\omega = \frac{\sigma}{2\sqrt{\pi}} e^{-\frac14 \sigma^2t^2}$$

Applying directly the definition of step response,

$$V(t) = V_0{H*h}(t) = \frac{V_0}{\sqrt\pi} \int\limits_{-\infty}^{\sigma t/2}e^{-\tau^2} \, d\tau = \frac{V_0}{2} \left[1+\operatorname{erf}\left(\frac{\sigma t}{2}\right)\right] \quad \Longleftrightarrow \quad \frac{V(t)}{V_0} = \frac{1}{2} \left[1+\operatorname{erf}\left(\frac{\sigma t}{2}\right)\right].$$

To determine the 10% to 90% rise time of the system it is necessary to solve for time the two following equations:

$$\frac{V(t_1)}{V_0} = 0.1 = \frac{1}{2}\left[1+\operatorname{erf}\left(\frac{\sigma t_1}{2}\right)\right]
\qquad \frac{V(t_2)}{V_0} = 0.9= \frac{1}{2}\left[1+\operatorname{erf}\left(\frac{\sigma t_2}{2}\right)\right],$$

By using known properties of the error function, the value t = −t_{1} = t_{2} is found: since t_{r} = t_{2} − t_{1} = 2t,

$$t_r=\frac{4}{\sigma} \operatorname{erf}^{-1}(0.8) \cong \frac{0.3394}{f_H},$$

and finally

$t_r\cong\frac{0.34}{BW}\quad\Longleftrightarrow\quad BW\cdot t_r\cong 0.34.$

==== One-stage low-pass RC network ====
For a simple one-stage low-pass RC network, the 10% to 90% rise time is proportional to the network time constant τ = RC:

$$t_r\cong 2.197\tau$$

The proportionality constant can be derived from the knowledge of the step response of the network to a unit step function input signal of V_{0} amplitude:

$$V(t) = V_0 \left(1-e^{-\frac{t}{\tau}} \right)$$

Solving for time

$$\frac{V(t)}{V_0}=\left(1-e^{-\frac{t}{\tau}}\right) \quad \Longleftrightarrow \quad \frac{V(t)}{V_0}-1=-e^{-\frac{t}{\tau}} \quad \Longleftrightarrow \quad 1-\frac{V(t)}{V_0}=e^{-\frac{t}{\tau}},$$

and finally,

$$\ln\left(1-\frac{V(t)}{V_0}\right)=-\frac{t}{\tau} \quad \Longleftrightarrow \quad t = -\tau \; \ln\left(1-\frac{V(t)}{V_0}\right)$$

Since t_{1} and t_{2} are such that

$$\frac{V(t_1)}{V_0}=0.1 \qquad \frac{V(t_2)}{V_0}=0.9,$$

solving these equations we find the analytical expression for t_{1} and t_{2}:

$$t_1 = -\tau\;\ln\left(1-0.1\right) = -\tau \; \ln\left(0.9\right) = -\tau\;\ln\left(\frac{9}{10}\right) = \tau\;\ln\left(\frac{10}{9}\right) = \tau({\ln 10}-{\ln 9})$$

$$t_2=\tau\ln{10}$$

The rise time is therefore proportional to the time constant:

$$t_r = t_2-t_1 = \tau\cdot\ln 9\cong\tau\cdot 2.197$$

Now, noting that

$\tau = RC = \frac{1}{2\pi f_H},$

then

$$t_r=\frac{2\ln3}{2\pi f_H}=\frac{\ln3}{\pi f_H}\cong\frac{0.349}{f_H},$$

and since the high frequency cutoff is equal to the bandwidth,

$t_r\cong\frac{0.35}{BW}\quad\Longleftrightarrow\quad BW\cdot t_r\cong 0.35.$

Finally note that, if the 20% to 80% rise time is considered instead, t_{r} becomes:

$$t_r = \tau\cdot\ln\frac{8}{2}=(2\ln2)\tau
\cong 1.386\tau\quad\Longleftrightarrow\quad t_r=\frac{\ln2}{\pi BW}\cong\frac{0.22}{BW}$$

==== One-stage low-pass LR network ====
Even for a simple one-stage low-pass RL network, the 10% to 90% rise time is proportional to the network time constant τ = L/R. The formal proof of this assertion proceed exactly as shown in the previous section: the only difference between the final expressions for the rise time is due to the difference in the expressions for the time constant τ of the two different circuits, leading in the present case to the following result

$$t_r=\tau\cdot\ln 9 = \frac{L}{R}\cdot\ln 9\cong \frac{L}{R} \cdot 2.197$$

=== Rise time of damped second order systems ===
According to Levine (1996, p. 158), for underdamped systems used in control theory rise time is commonly defined as the time for a waveform to go from 0% to 100% of its final value: accordingly, the rise time from 0 to 100% of an underdamped 2nd-order system has the following form:

$$t_r \cdot\omega_0= \frac{1}{\sqrt{1-\zeta^2}}\left [ \pi - \tan^{-1}\left ( {\frac{\sqrt{1-\zeta^2}}{\zeta}} \right) \right ]$$

The quadratic approximation for normalized rise time for a 2nd-order system, step response, no zeros is:

$$t_r \cdot\omega_0= 2.230\zeta^2-0.078\zeta+1.12$$

where ζ is the damping ratio and ω_{0} is the natural frequency of the network.

=== Rise time of cascaded blocks ===
Consider a system composed by n cascaded non interacting blocks, each having a rise time t_{r_{i}}, i = 1,…,n, and no overshoot in their step response: suppose also that the input signal of the first block has a rise time whose value is t_{r_{S}}. Afterwards, its output signal has a rise time t_{r_{0}} equal to

$$t_{r_O} = \sqrt{t_{r_S}^2+t_{r_1}^2+\dots+t_{r_n}^2}$$

According to Valley & Wallman (1948, pp. 77–78), this result is a consequence of the central limit theorem and was proved by Wallman (1950): however, a detailed analysis of the problem is presented by Petitt & McWhorter (1961, §4–9, pp. 107–115), who also credit Elmore (1948) as the first one to prove the previous formula on a somewhat rigorous basis.

== See also ==
- Frequency response
- Impulse response
- Step response
- Settling time
