= Ringing (signal) =

Oscillation of a signal, usually in step response

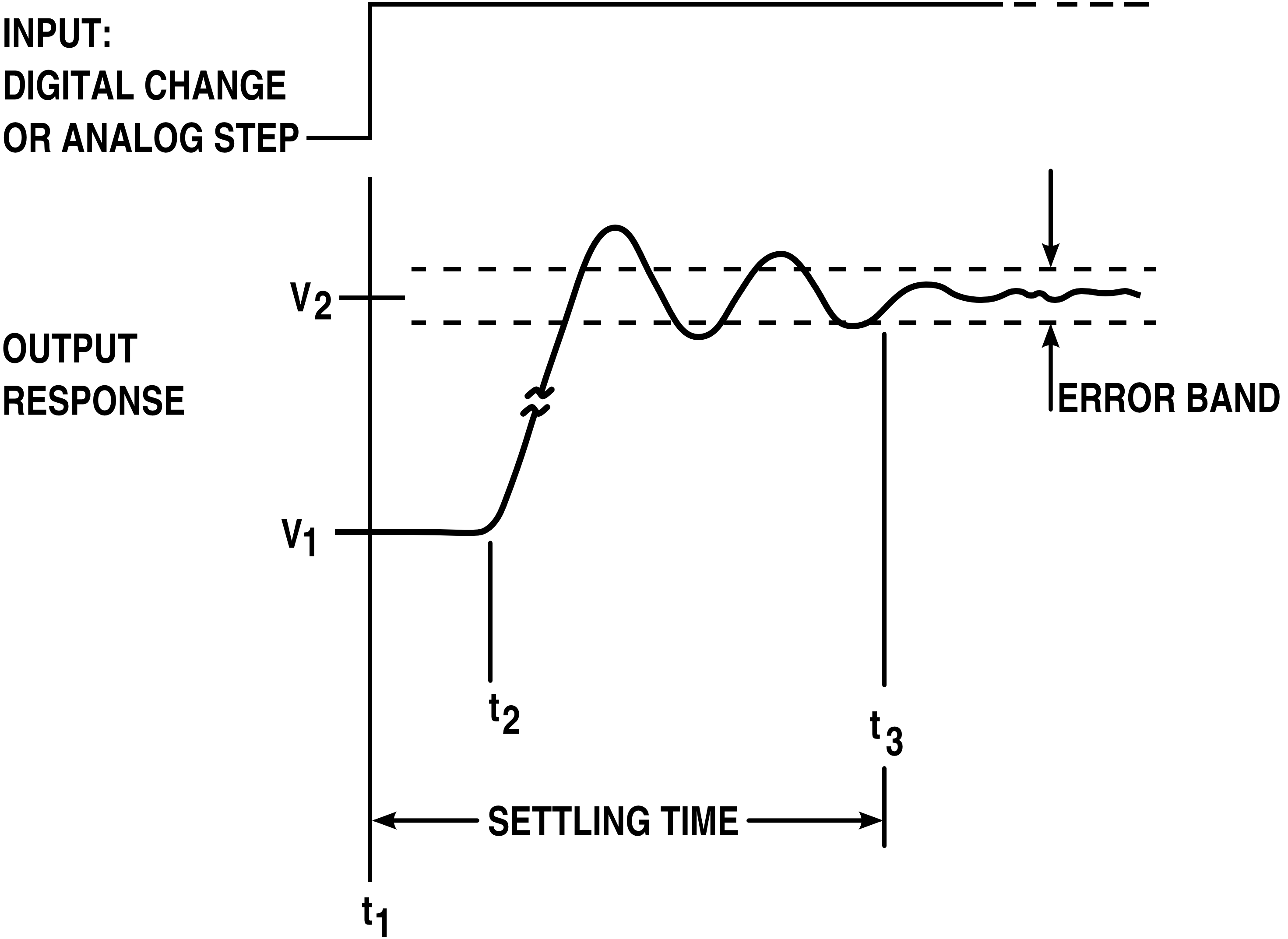
An illustration of overshoot, followed by ringing and settle time.

In electronics, signal processing, and video, ringing is oscillation of a signal, particularly in the step response (the response to a sudden change in input). Often ringing is undesirable, but not always, as in the case of resonant inductive coupling. It is also known as hunting.

It is also known as ripple, particularly in electricity or in frequency domain response.

== Electrical circuits ==
In electrical circuits, ringing is an oscillation of a voltage or current. Ringing can be undesirable because it causes extra current to flow, thereby wasting energy and causing extra heating of the components; it can cause unwanted electromagnetic radiation to be emitted; it can increase settling time for the desired final state; and it may cause unwanted triggering of bistable elements in digital circuits. Ringy communications circuits may suffer falsing.

Two electrical sources of this ringing are:

1. A resonant transient response due to undesired parasitic capacitances and inductances in the circuit creating a resonant frequency. This is often the damping response following overshoot or undershoot, and thus these related concepts are at times conflated. This ringing can be reduced by a slower slew rate and possibly eliminated by critically dampening the resonance.
2. Signal reflection, which may be minimized by impedance matching.

While either issue can be addressed with a series termination resistor, a resistor cannot simultaneously critically damp the response and perfectly match the impedance without losing some power on the series resistor, so a bypass capacitor may be preferred.

== Analog video ==
In a cathode-ray tube (CRT) video circuit, electrical ringing causes closely spaced repeated ghosts of a vertical or diagonal edge where dark changes to light or vice versa, going from left to right, whereby the electron beam's intensity overshoots and undershoots the desired intensity there a few times instead of settling quickly. This bouncing could occur anywhere in the electronics or cabling and is often caused by or accentuated by a too high setting of the sharpness control.

== Analog audio ==
Ringing can affect audio equipment in a number of ways. Audio amplifiers can produce ringing depending on their design, although the transients that can produce such ringing rarely occur in audio signals.

Transducers (i.e., microphones and loudspeakers) can also ring. Mechanical ringing is more of a problem with loudspeakers as the moving masses are larger and less easily damped, but unless extreme they are difficult to audibly identify.

== Signal processing ==
In signal processing, "ringing" may refer to ringing artifacts: spurious signals near sharp transitions. These have a number of causes, and occur for instance in JPEG compression and as pre-echo in some digital audio compression.

Signals constructed as only a partial (not infinite) Fourier series of a function containing discontinuities (e.g. when applying a brickwall lowpass filter to a square wave) create a ringing error called the Gibbs phenomenon before and after each discontinuity.

== See also ==
- Microphonics
- Ripple (electrical)
- Impedance matching
