= Jean Mahseredjian =

Electrical engineer

Jean Mahseredjian is an electrical engineer at the Ecole Polytechnique de Montreal, Quebec. He was named a Fellow of the Institute of Electrical and Electronics Engineers (IEEE) in 2013 for his contributions to the computation and modeling of power system transients.
