= Strejc method =

The Strejc system identification method allows the estimate of the transfer function of a non-periodic, black box-type system based on its step response and is widely used in all branches of industrial and mechanical engineering.

It allows specifically to estimate the order n of the studied system, its time constant and its delay.

To use the Strejc method, it is necessary to apply a step signal to the system and record its t_{u} and t_{g} parameters by observing the inflection point of the response curve. These parameters are then compared with the ones in the numeric table to estimate what order approximates better the system's behaviour and then find the time constant t with the second column (using the appropriate order).

== Strejc table ==
| Order (n) | tû/t | tg/t | tu/tg |
|---|---|---|---|
| 1 | 0 | 1 | 0 |
| 2 | 0.28 | 2.72 | 0.1 |
| 3 | 0.8 | 3.7 | 0.22 |
| 4 | 1.42 | 4.46 | 0.32 |
| 5 | 2.10 | 5.12 | 0.41 |
| 6 | 2.81 | 5.70 | 0.49 |

== See also ==
- System identification
