= PKS 1222+216 =

Quasar located in the constellation of Coma Berenices

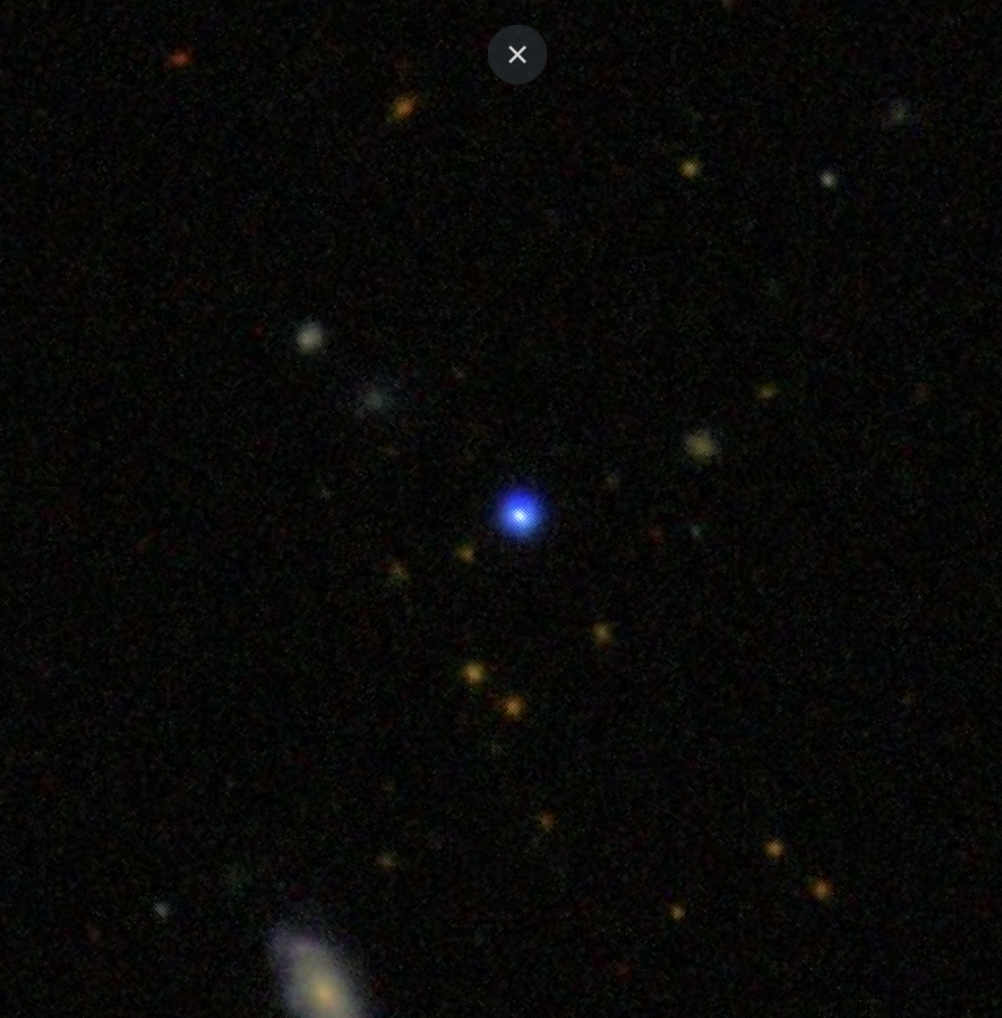
- SDSS image of PKS 1222+216. The galaxy on the bottom left of the image is the spiral galaxy, PGC 40438.

Observation data (J2000.0 epoch)
- Constellation: Coma Berenices
- Right ascension: 12^{h} 24^{m} 54.45^{s}
- Declination: +21° 22′ 46.38″
- Redshift: 0.433826
- Heliocentric radial velocity: 130,058 km/s
- Distance: 4.695 Gly
- Apparent magnitude (V): 17.50

Characteristics
- Type: Blazar LPQ
- Size: ~340,000 ly (104.2 kpc) (estimated)
- Notable features: VHE emitter, blazar

Other designations
- 4C 21.35, 2MASS J12245446+2122463, LEDA 2819691, 7C 1222+2139, SDSS J122454.45+212246.3, ON +238, CoNFIG 134, RX J1224.9+2122, TeV J1224+213, ICRF J122454.4+212246, 2PBC J1224.8+2122

PKS 1222+216 also known as 4C 21.35, is a quasar located in the constellation of Coma Berenices. The redshift of the object is (z) 0.433, estimating the object to be located 4.6 billion light-years from Earth and it was first discovered by astronomers in 1966 as a radio source. The radio spectrum of PKS 1222+216 is considered as flat, thus the classification of it being a flat-spectrum radio quasar.

== Description ==
=== Flaring activity ===
PKS 1222+216 is a blazar, mainly being optically violently variable on the electromagnetic spectrum and also described as a very high energy emitter. When first observed in April 2009 it was shown to be in an active phase, with an increasing amount of gamma-ray flux reaching around 4.6 ± 1.6 × 10^{−7} photons cm^{−2} s^{−1}. By December 15, 2009, the source's flux had reached 3.4 ± 0.5 × 10^{−6} photons cm^{−2} s^{−1}, marking this as an increase by a factor of 40.

Two powerful gamma-ray flares were detected from PKS 1222+216 by various observations in April and June 2010. The object displayed a broken power-law form with observed spectra breaks near the ranges between 1 and 3 GeV photons. The optical polarimetric observations also noted the variability of the source in both polarization and position angle, with a detected decrease in brightness levels of 0.34 magnitude between 19 and 22 June in V band. Following the flare of April 2010, the source exhibited an immense increase in near-infrared flux.

In 2014 PKS 1222+216 underwent several more flaring periods. When detected, both flares (Flare A and Flare B) were shown to be accompanied by two subflares, occurring within a time span of three days. The subflare of Flare A displayed a slow rising trend, reaching a maximum at MJD (56699 ± 0.5), subsequently followed by a rapid decrease. Subflare 2 of Flare A, displayed an increase to its maximum peak, before displaying a slow decay time. The flux for Flare A has been estimated as 3.2 ± 0.42 × 10^{−6} photon cm^{−2} s^{−1}. The subflares of Flare B on the other hand, showed a rapid rise time, subsequently followed by a slow decay time lasting 0.6 days.

=== Radio Source ===
The structure of the source of PKS 1222+216, is compact and highly distorted with an angular extent of 17 arcseconds. When imaged with the Very Large Array (VLA) on kiloparsec scales, it has a bright radio core surrounded by radio emission that is 100 kiloparsecs in extent. A secondary component is seen extending 12 arcseconds from the core. There is a jet present in the source, originating in the northeast before abruptly bending eastwards and ending in a hotspot located 60 kiloparsecs from the core. This jet is also superluminal, with at least five jet knots moving at fast speeds between the ranges of 9c and 22c. Observations also found two of these knots were shown ejecting during quasar flaring periods.

== Quasi-periodic oscillation and supermassive black hole mass ==
In 2022, PKS 1222+216 was shown undergoing a quasi-periodic oscillation with a period of around 420 days based on optical photometric and polarimetric data observations conducted for 10 years. This is explained by a blob feature moving in helical motion inside a jet. The central supermassive black hole mass for the quasar has been estimated as 6 × 10^{8} M_{☉} based on a virial method of its broad emission lines.
