= Spijker's lemma =

In mathematics, Spijker's lemma is a result in the theory of rational mappings of the Riemann sphere. It states that the image of a circle under a complex rational map with numerator and denominator having degree at most n has length at most 2nπ.

== Applications ==
Spijker's lemma can be used to derive a sharp bound version of Kreiss matrix theorem.

== See also ==
- Buffon's needle
