= Kreiss matrix theorem =

In matrix analysis, Kreiss matrix theorem relates the so-called Kreiss constant of a matrix with the power iterates of this matrix. It was originally introduced by Heinz-Otto Kreiss to analyze the stability of finite difference methods for partial difference equations.

== Kreiss constant of a matrix ==
Given a matrix A, the Kreiss constant 𝒦(A) (with respect to the closed unit circle) of A is defined as

$\mathcal{K}(\mathbf{A})=\sup _{|z|>1}(|z|-1)\left\|(z-\mathbf{A})^{-1}\right\|,$

while the Kreiss constant 𝒦_{lhp}(A) with respect to the left-half plane is given by

$\mathcal{K}_{\textrm{lhp}}(\mathbf{A})=\sup _{\Re(z)>0}(\Re(z))\left\|(z-\mathbf{A})^{-1}\right\|.$

=== Properties ===
- For any matrix A, one has that 𝒦(A) ≥ 1 and 𝒦_{lhp}(A) ≥ 1. In particular, 𝒦(A) (resp. 𝒦_{lhp}(A)) are finite only if the matrix A is Schur stable (resp. Hurwitz stable).
- Kreiss constant can be interpreted as a measure of normality of a matrix. In particular, for normal matrices A with spectral radius less than 1, one has that 𝒦(A) = 1. Similarly, for normal matrices A that are Hurwitz stable, 𝒦_{lhp}(A) = 1.
- 𝒦(A) and 𝒦_{lhp}(A) have alternative definitions through the pseudospectrum Λ_{ε}(A):
  - $\mathcal{K}(A)=\sup _{\varepsilon>0} \frac{\rho_{\varepsilon}(A)-1}{\varepsilon}$ , where p_{ε}(A) = max{|λ| : λ ∈ Λ_{ε}(A)},
  - $\mathcal{K}_{\textrm{lhp}}(A)=\sup _{\varepsilon>0} \frac{\alpha_{\varepsilon}(A)}{\varepsilon}$, where α_{ε}(A) = max{Re|λ| : λ ∈ Λ_{ε}(A)}.
- 𝒦_{lhp}(A) can be computed through robust control methods.

== Statement of Kreiss matrix theorem ==
Let A be a square matrix of order n and e be the Euler's number. The modern and sharp version of Kreiss matrix theorem states that the inequality below is tight

$\mathcal{K}(\mathbf{A}) \leq \sup_{k \geq 0}\left\|\mathbf{A}^k\right\| \leq e\, n\, \mathcal{K}(\mathbf{A}),$

and it follows from the application of Spijker's lemma.

There also exists an analogous result in terms of the Kreiss constant with respect to the left-half plane and the matrix exponential:

$\mathcal{K}_{\mathrm{lhp}}(\mathbf{A}) \leq \sup _{t \geq 0}\left\|\mathrm{e}^{t \mathbf{A}}\right\| \leq e \, n \, \mathcal{K}_{\mathrm{lhp}}(\mathbf{A})$

== Consequences and applications ==
The value $\sup_{k \geq 0}\left\|\mathbf{A}^k\right\|$ (respectively, $\sup _{t \geq 0}\left\|\mathrm{e}^{t \mathbf{A}}\right\|$) can be interpreted as the maximum transient growth of the discrete-time system $x_{k+1}=A x_k$ (respectively, continuous-time system $\dot{x}=A x$).

Thus, the Kreiss matrix theorem gives both upper and lower bounds on the transient behavior of the system with dynamics given by the matrix A: a large (and finite) Kreiss constant indicates that the system will have an accentuated transient phase before decaying to zero.
