= Steady state (electronics) =

Equilibrium condition of an electrical circuit after transient effects have subsided

In electronics, steady state is an equilibrium condition of a circuit or network that occurs as the effects of transients are no longer important. Steady state is reached (attained) after transient (initial, oscillating or turbulent) state has subsided. During steady state, a system is in relative stability. The term sinusoidal steady state emphasizes that sine waves of essentially-infinite duration may exist, as long as their amplitude and frequency remain constant.

Steady state determination is an important topic, because many design specifications of electronic systems are given in terms of the steady-state characteristics. Periodic steady-state solution is also a prerequisite for small signal dynamic modeling. Steady-state analysis is therefore an indispensable component of the design process.

== Calculation methods ==
Steady state calculation methods can be sorted into time-domain algorithms (time domain sensitivities, shooting) and frequency-domain algorithms (harmonic balance) methods, are the best choice for most microwave circuits excited with sinusoidal signals (e.g. mixers, power amplifiers).

=== Time domain methods ===
Time domain methods can be further divided into one step methods (time domain sensitivities) and iterative methods (shooting methods). One step methods require derivatives to compute the steady state; whenever those are not readily available at hand, iterative methods come into focus.

== See also ==
- Frequency response
- Stiff circuits
- Harmonic balance
- Time domain sensitivities
- Shooting method
- Transient response
