= Settling time =

Time required for the output of an amplifier to stabilize

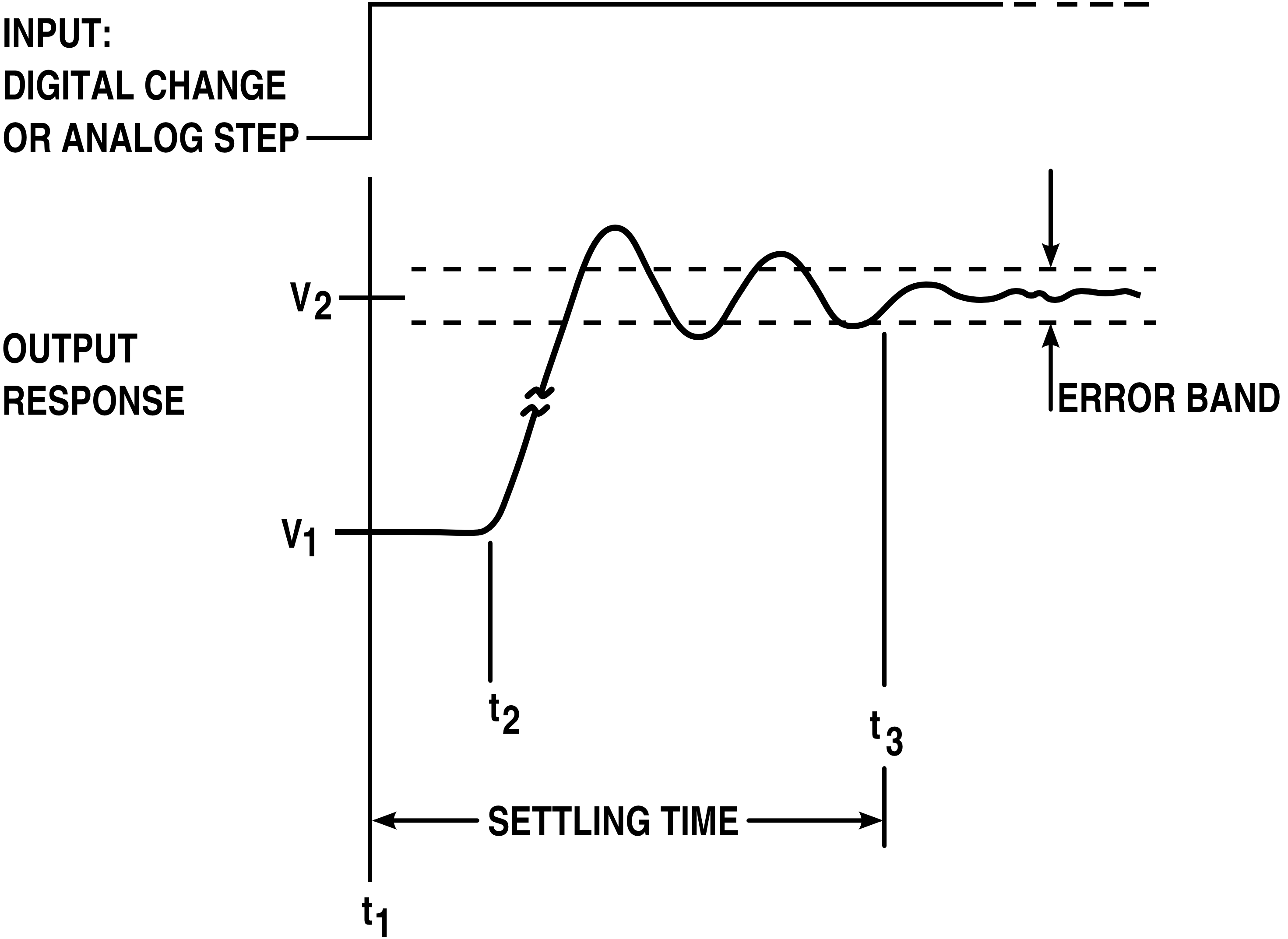
Settling time is the time required for an output to reach and remain within a given error band following some input stimulus.

In control theory, the settling time of a dynamical system, such as an amplifier or other output device, is the time elapsed from the application of an ideal instantaneous step input to the time at which the amplifier output has entered and remained within a specified error band.

Settling time includes a propagation delay, plus the time required for the output to slew to the vicinity of the final value, recover from the overload condition associated with slew, and finally settle to within the specified error.

Systems with energy storage cannot respond instantaneously and will exhibit transient responses when they are subjected to inputs or disturbances.

== Definition ==
Tay, Mareels and Moore (1998) defined settling time as "the time required for the response curve to reach and stay within a range of certain percentage (usually 5% or 2%) of the final value."

== Mathematical detail ==
Settling time depends on the system response and natural frequency.

The settling time for a second order, underdamped system with natural frequency $\omega_n$ responding to a step response can be approximated if the damping ratio $\zeta \ll 1$ by
$$T_s = -\frac{\ln (\text{tolerance fraction})}{\text{damping ratio} \times \text{natural freq}}$$

A general form is
$$T_s = -\frac{\ln (\text{tolerance fraction} \times \sqrt{1-\zeta^2} )}{\text{damping ratio} \times \text{natural freq}}$$

Thus, if the damping ratio $\zeta \ll 1$, settling time to within 2% = 0.02 is:
$$T_s = -\frac{\ln(0.02)}{\zeta \omega_n}\approx\frac{3.9}{\zeta \omega_n}$$

== See also ==
- Rise time
- Time constant
