= Step response =

Time behavior of a system controlled by Heaviside step functions

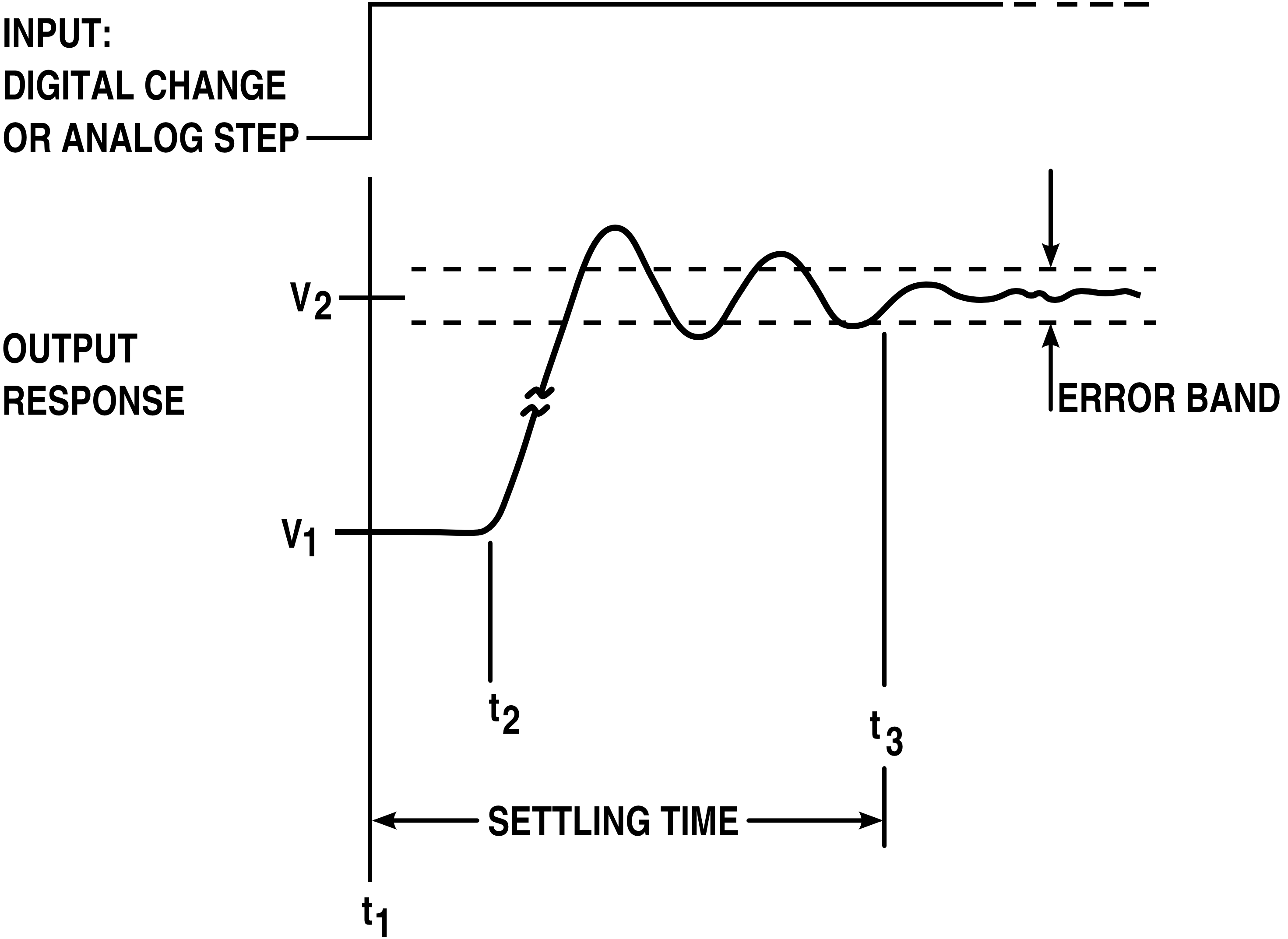
A typical step response for a second order system, illustrating overshoot, followed by ringing, all subsiding within a settling time

The step response of a system in a given initial state consists of the time evolution of its outputs when its control inputs are Heaviside step functions. In electronic engineering and control theory, step response is the time behaviour of the outputs of a general system when its inputs change from zero to one in a very short time. The concept can be extended to the abstract mathematical notion of a dynamical system using an evolution parameter.

From a practical standpoint, knowing how the system responds to a sudden input is important because large and possibly fast deviations from the long term steady state may have extreme effects on the component itself and on other portions of the overall system dependent on this component. In addition, the overall system cannot act until the component's output settles down to some vicinity of its final state, delaying the overall system response. Formally, knowing the step response of a dynamical system gives information on the stability of such a system, and on its ability to reach one stationary state when starting from another.

== Formal mathematical description ==
Figure 4: Black box representation of a dynamical system, its input and its step response.

This section provides a formal mathematical definition of step response in terms of the abstract mathematical concept of a dynamical system $\mathfrak{S}$: all notations and assumptions required for the following description are listed here.

- $t\in T$ is the evolution parameter of the system, called "time" for the sake of simplicity,
- $\boldsymbol{x}|_t\in M$ is the state of the system at time $t$, called "output" for the sake of simplicity,
- $\Phi:T \times M \to M$ is the dynamical system evolution function,
- $\Phi(0,\boldsymbol{x}) = \boldsymbol{x}_0 \in M$ is the dynamical system initial state,
- $H(t)$ is the Heaviside step function

=== Nonlinear dynamical system ===
For a general dynamical system, the step response is defined as follows:

$$\boldsymbol{x}|_t = \Phi_{\{H(t)\}} \left(t,{\boldsymbol{x}_0} \right).$$

It is the evolution function when the control inputs (or source term, or forcing inputs) are Heaviside functions: the notation emphasizes this concept showing H(t) as a subscript.

=== Linear dynamical system ===
For a linear time-invariant (LTI) black box, let $\mathfrak{S} \equiv S$ for notational convenience: the step response can be obtained by convolution of the Heaviside step function control and the impulse response h(t) of the system itself

$$a(t) = (h*H)(t) = \int_{-\infty }^{+\infty} h(\tau) H(t - \tau)\,d\tau = \int_{-\infty}^t h(\tau)\,d\tau.$$

which for an LTI system is equivalent to just integrating the latter. Conversely, for an LTI system, the derivative of the step response yields the impulse response:

$$h(t) = \frac{d}{dt}\,a(t).$$

However, these simple relations are not true for a non-linear or time-variant system.

== Time domain versus frequency domain ==
Instead of frequency response, system performance may be specified in terms of parameters describing time-dependence of response. The step response can be described by the following quantities related to its time behavior,

- overshoot
- rise time
- settling time
- ringing

In the case of linear dynamic systems, much can be inferred about the system from these characteristics. Below the step response of a simple two-pole amplifier is presented, and some of these terms are illustrated.

In LTI systems, the function that has the steepest slew rate that doesn't create overshoot or ringing is the Gaussian function. This is because it is the only function whose Fourier transform has the same shape.

== Feedback amplifiers ==
Figure 1: Ideal negative feedback model; open loop gain is A_{OL} and feedback factor is β.

This section describes the step response of a simple negative feedback amplifier shown in Figure 1. The feedback amplifier consists of a main open-loop amplifier of gain A_{OL} and a feedback loop governed by a feedback factor β. This feedback amplifier is analyzed to determine how its step response depends upon the time constants governing the response of the main amplifier, and upon the amount of feedback used.

A negative-feedback amplifier has gain given by (see negative feedback amplifier):

$$A_{FB} = \frac {A_{OL}} {1+ \beta A_{OL}},$$

where A_{OL} = open-loop gain, A_{FB} = closed-loop gain (the gain with negative feedback present) and β = feedback factor.

=== With one dominant pole ===
In many cases, the forward amplifier can be sufficiently well modeled in terms of a single dominant pole of time constant τ; that is, as an open-loop gain given by:

$$A_{OL} = \frac {A_0} {1+j \omega \tau},$$

with zero-frequency gain A_{0} and angular frequency ω = 2πf. This forward amplifier has unit step response

$$S_{OL}(t) = A_0(1 -   e^{-t / \tau})$$,

an exponential approach from 0 toward the new equilibrium value of A_{0}.

The one-pole amplifier's transfer function leads to the closed-loop gain:

$$A_{FB} = \frac {A_0} {1+ \beta A_0} \; \cdot \; \  \frac {1} {1+j \omega \frac { \tau } {1 + \beta A_0} }.$$

This closed-loop gain is of the same form as the open-loop gain: a one-pole filter. Its step response is of the same form: an exponential decay toward the new equilibrium value. But the time constant of the closed-loop step function is τ / (1 + β A_{0}), so it is faster than the forward amplifier's response by a factor of 1 + β A_{0}:

$$S_{FB}(t) =  \frac {A_0} {1+ \beta A_0} \left(1 -   e^{-t (1 + \beta A_0)/ \tau}\right),$$

As the feedback factor β is increased, the step response will get faster, until the original assumption of one dominant pole is no longer accurate. If there is a second pole, then as the closed-loop time constant approaches the time constant of the second pole, a two-pole analysis is needed.

=== Two-pole amplifiers ===
In the case that the open-loop gain has two poles (two time constants, τ_{1}, τ_{2}), the step response is a bit more complicated. The open-loop gain is given by:

$$A_{OL} = \frac {A_0} {(1+j \omega \tau_1) (1 + j \omega \tau_2)},$$

with zero-frequency gain A_{0} and angular frequency ω = 2πf.

==== Analysis ====
The two-pole amplifier's transfer function leads to the closed-loop gain:

$$A_{FB} = \frac {A_0} {1+ \beta A_0} \; \cdot \; \  \frac {1} {1+j \omega \frac { \tau_1 + \tau_2 } {1 + \beta A_0} + (j \omega )^2 \frac { \tau_1 \tau_2} {1 + \beta A_0} }.$$

Figure 2: Conjugate pole locations for a two-pole feedback amplifier; Re(s) is the real axis and Im(s) is the imaginary axis.

The time dependence of the amplifier is easy to discover by switching variables to s = jω, whereupon the gain becomes:

$$A_{FB} = \frac {A_0} { \tau_1 \tau_2 } \; \cdot \; \frac {1} {s^2 +s \left( \frac {1} {\tau_1} + \frac {1} {\tau_2} \right) + \frac {1+ \beta A_0} {\tau_1 \tau_2}}$$

The poles of this expression (that is, the zeros of the denominator) occur at:

$$2s = - \left( \frac {1} {\tau_1} + \frac {1} {\tau_2} \right)
\pm \sqrt { \left( \frac {1} {\tau_1} - \frac {1} {\tau_2} \right) ^2 -\frac {4 \beta A_0 } {\tau_1 \tau_2 } },$$

which shows for large enough values of βA_{0} the square root becomes the square root of a negative number, that is the square root becomes imaginary, and the pole positions are complex conjugate numbers, either s_{+} or s_{−}; see Figure 2:

$$s_{\pm} = -\rho \pm j \mu,$$

with

$$\rho = \frac {1}{2} \left( \frac {1} {\tau_1} + \frac {1} {\tau_2} \right ),$$

and

$$\mu = \frac {1} {2} \sqrt { \frac {4 \beta A_0} { \tau_1 \tau_2} - \left( \frac {1} {\tau_1} - \frac {1} {\tau_2} \right)^2 }.$$

Using polar coordinates with the magnitude of the radius to the roots given by |s| (Figure 2):

$$| s | = |s_{ \pm } | =  \sqrt{ \rho^2 +\mu^2},$$

and the angular coordinate φ is given by:

$$\cos \phi = \frac { \rho} { | s | } , \sin \phi = \frac { \mu} { | s | }.$$

Tables of Laplace transforms show that the time response of such a system is composed of combinations of the two functions:

$$e^{- \rho t} \sin ( \mu t) \quad\text{and} \quad  e^{- \rho t} \cos ( \mu t),$$

which is to say, the solutions are damped oscillations in time. In particular, the unit step response of the system is:

$$S(t) = \left(\frac {A_0} {1+ \beta A_0}\right)\left(1 -   e^{- \rho t} \  \frac {  \sin \left( \mu t + \phi \right)}{ \sin \phi}\right)\ ,$$

which simplifies to

$$S(t) = 1 -   e^{- \rho t} \  \frac {  \sin \left( \mu t + \phi \right)}{ \sin \phi}$$

when A_{0} tends to infinity and the feedback factor β is one.

Notice that the damping of the response is set by ρ, that is, by the time constants of the open-loop amplifier. In contrast, the frequency of oscillation is set by μ, that is, by the feedback parameter through βA_{0}. Because ρ is a sum of reciprocals of time constants, it is interesting to notice that ρ is dominated by the shorter of the two.

==== Results ====
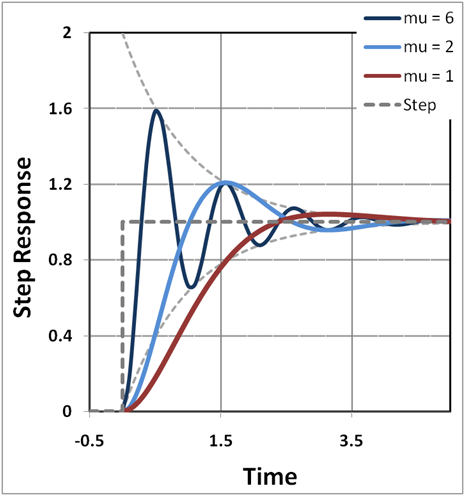
Figure 3: Step-response of a linear two-pole feedback amplifier; time is in units of 1/ρ, that is, in terms of the time constants of A_{OL}; curves are plotted for three values of mu = μ, which is controlled by β.

Figure 3 shows the time response to a unit step input for three values of the parameter μ. It can be seen that the frequency of oscillation increases with μ, but the oscillations are contained between the two asymptotes set by the exponentials [ 1 − exp(−ρt) ] and [ 1 + exp(−ρt) ]. These asymptotes are determined by ρ and therefore by the time constants of the open-loop amplifier, independent of feedback.

The phenomenon of oscillation about the final value is called ringing. The overshoot is the maximum swing above final value, and clearly increases with μ. Likewise, the undershoot is the minimum swing below final value, again increasing with μ. The settling time is the time for departures from final value to sink below some specified level, say 10% of final value.

The dependence of settling time upon μ is not obvious, and the approximation of a two-pole system probably is not accurate enough to make any real-world conclusions about feedback dependence of settling time. However, the asymptotes [ 1 − exp(−ρt) ] and [ 1 + exp (−ρt) ] clearly impact settling time, and they are controlled by the time constants of the open-loop amplifier, particularly the shorter of the two time constants. That suggests that a specification on settling time must be met by appropriate design of the open-loop amplifier.

The two major conclusions from this analysis are:

1. Feedback controls the amplitude of oscillation about final value for a given open-loop amplifier and given values of open-loop time constants, τ_{1} and τ_{2}.
2. The open-loop amplifier decides settling time. It sets the time scale of Figure 3, and the faster the open-loop amplifier, the faster this time scale.

As an aside, it may be noted that real-world departures from this linear two-pole model occur due to two major complications: first, real amplifiers have more than two poles, as well as zeros; and second, real amplifiers are nonlinear, so their step response changes with signal amplitude.

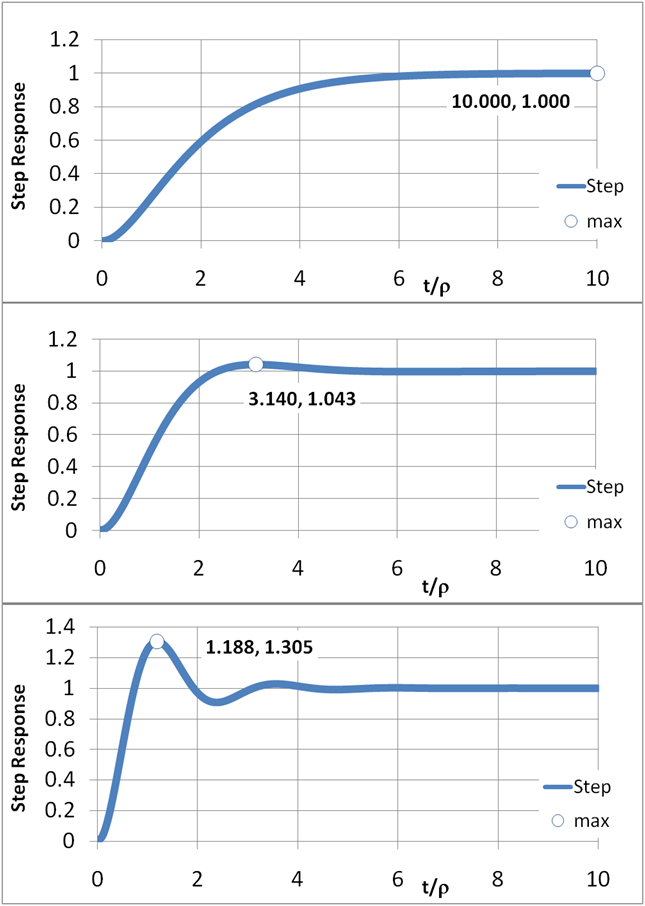
Figure 4: Step response for three values of α. Top: α = 4; Center: α = 2; Bottom: α = 0.5. As α is reduced the pole separation reduces, and the overshoot increases.

==== Control of overshoot ====
How overshoot may be controlled by appropriate parameter choices is discussed next.

Using the equations above, the amount of overshoot can be found by differentiating the step response and finding its maximum value. The result for maximum step response S_{max} is:

$$S_\max= 1 + \exp \left( - \pi \frac { \rho }{ \mu } \right).$$

The final value of the step response is 1, so the exponential is the actual overshoot itself. It is clear the overshoot is zero if μ = 0, which is the condition:

$$\frac {4 \beta A_0} { \tau_1 \tau_2} = \left( \frac {1} {\tau_1} - \frac {1} {\tau_2} \right)^2.$$

This quadratic is solved for the ratio of time constants by setting x = (τ_{1} / τ_{2})^{1/2} with the result

$$x = \sqrt{ \beta A_0 } + \sqrt { \beta A_0 +1 }.$$

Because β A_{0} ≫ 1, the 1 in the square root can be dropped, and the result is

$$\frac { \tau_1} { \tau_2} = 4 \beta A_0.$$

In words, the first time constant must be much larger than the second. To be more adventurous than a design allowing for no overshoot we can introduce a factor α in the above relation:

$$\frac { \tau_1} { \tau_2} = \alpha \beta A_0,$$

and let α be set by the amount of overshoot that is acceptable.

Figure 4 illustrates the procedure. Comparing the top panel (α = 4) with the lower panel (α = 0.5) shows lower values for α increase the rate of response, but increase overshoot. The case α = 2 (center panel) is the maximally flat design that shows no peaking in the Bode gain vs. frequency plot. That design has the rule of thumb built-in safety margin to deal with non-ideal realities like multiple poles (or zeros), nonlinearity (signal amplitude dependence) and manufacturing variations, any of which can lead to too much overshoot. The adjustment of the pole separation (that is, setting α) is the subject of frequency compensation, and one such method is pole splitting.

==== Control of settling time ====
The amplitude of ringing in the step response in Figure 3 is governed by the damping factor exp(−ρt). That is, if we specify some acceptable step response deviation from final value, say Δ, that is:

$$S(t)  \le 1 + \Delta,$$

this condition is satisfied regardless of the value of β A_{OL} provided the time is longer than the settling time, say t_{S}, given by:

$$\Delta = e^{- \rho t_S }\text{ or }t_S = \frac { \ln \frac{1}{\Delta} } { \rho } = \tau_2 \frac {2 \ln \frac{1} { \Delta}  } { 1 + \frac { \tau_2 } { \tau_1} } \approx 2 \tau_2 \ln \frac{1} { \Delta},$$

where the τ_{1} ≫ τ_{2} is applicable because of the overshoot control condition, which makes τ_{1} = αβA_{OL} τ_{2}. Often the settling time condition is referred to by saying the settling period is inversely proportional to the unity gain bandwidth, because 1/(2π τ_{2}) is close to this bandwidth for an amplifier with typical dominant pole compensation. However, this result is more precise than this rule of thumb. As an example of this formula, if Δ = 1/e^{4} = 1.8 %, the settling time condition is t_{S} = 8 τ_{2}.

In general, control of overshoot sets the time constant ratio, and settling time t_{S} sets τ_{2}.

==== System Identification using the Step Response: System with two real poles ====
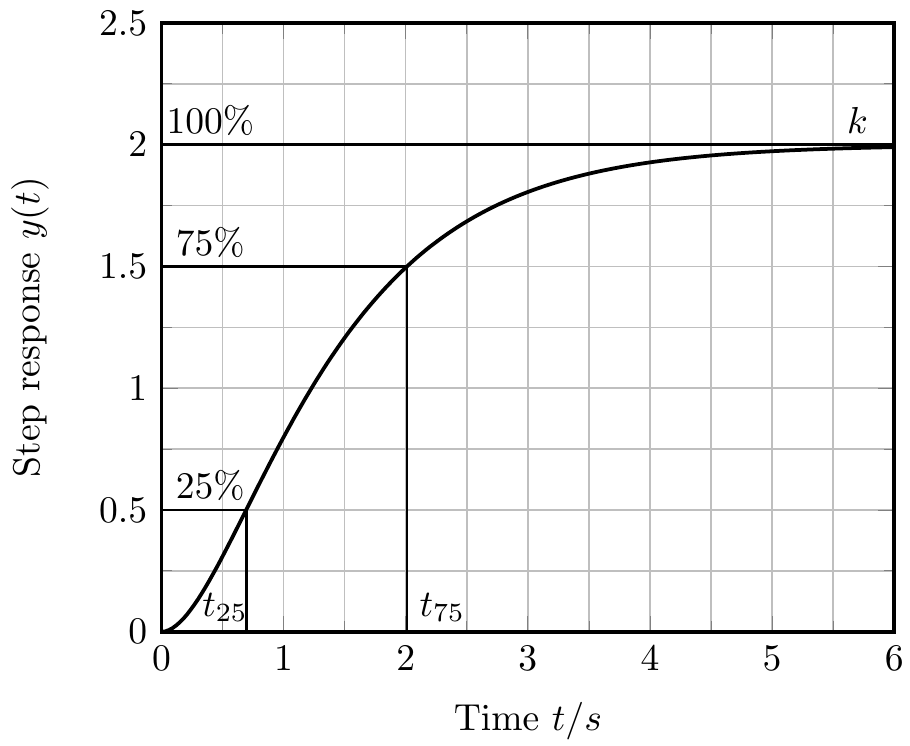
Step response of the system with $x(t)=1$. Measure the significant point $k$, $t_{25}$and $t_{75}$.

This method uses significant points of the step response. There is no need to guess tangents to the measured Signal. The equations are derived using numerical simulations, determining some significant ratios and fitting parameters of nonlinear equations. See also.

Here the steps:

- Measure the system step-response $y(t)$of the system with an input step signal $x(t)$.
- Determine the time-spans $t_{25}$and $t_{75}$where the step response reaches 25% and 75% of the steady state output value.
- Determine the system steady-state gain $k=A_0$with $k=\lim_{t\to\infty} \dfrac{y(t)}{x(t)}$
- Calculate
  $$r=\dfrac{t_{25}}{t_{75}}$$
  $$P=-18.56075\,r+\dfrac{0.57311}{r-0.20747}+4.16423$$
  $$X=14.2797\,r^3-9.3891\,r^2+0.25437\,r+1.32148$$
- Determine the two time constants
  $$\tau_2=T_2=\dfrac{t_{75}-t_{25}}{X\,(1+1/P)}$$
  $$\tau_1=T_1=\dfrac{T_2}{P}$$
- Calculate the transfer function of the identified system within the Laplace-domain
  $$G(s) = \dfrac{k}{(1+s\,T_1)\cdot(1+s\,T_2)}$$

==== Phase margin ====
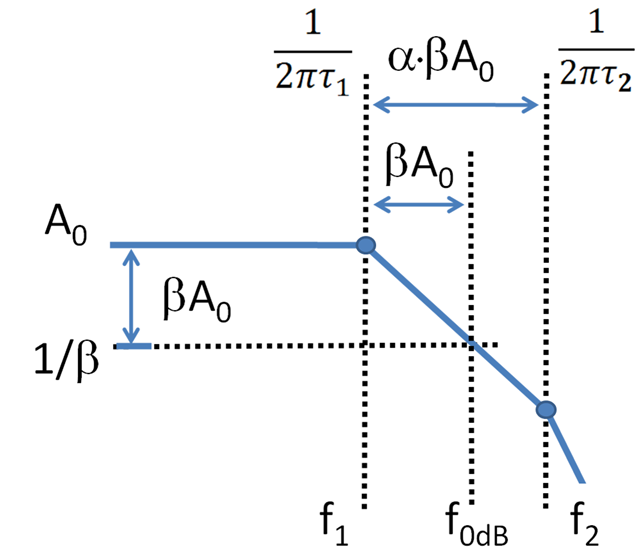
Figure 5: Bode gain plot to find phase margin; scales are logarithmic, so labeled separations are multiplicative factors. For example, f_{0 dB} = βA_{0} × f_{1}.

Next, the choice of pole ratio τ_{1}/τ_{2} is related to the phase margin of the feedback amplifier. The procedure outlined in the Bode plot article is followed. Figure 5 is the Bode gain plot for the two-pole amplifier in the range of frequencies up to the second pole position. The assumption behind Figure 5 is that the frequency f_{0 dB} lies between the lowest pole at f_{1} = 1/(2πτ_{1}) and the second pole at f_{2} = 1/(2πτ_{2}). As indicated in Figure 5, this condition is satisfied for values of α ≥ 1.

Using Figure 5 the frequency (denoted by f_{0 dB}) is found where the loop gain βA_{0} satisfies the unity gain or 0 dB condition, as defined by:

$$| \beta A_\text{OL} ( f_\text{0 db} ) | = 1.$$

The slope of the downward leg of the gain plot is (20 dB/decade); for every factor of ten increase in frequency, the gain drops by the same factor:

$$f_\text{0 dB} = \beta A_0 f_1.$$

The phase margin is the departure of the phase at f_{0 dB} from −180°. Thus, the margin is:

$$\phi_m = 180 ^\circ - \arctan (f_\text{0 dB} /f_1) - \arctan ( f_\text{0 dB} /f_2).$$

Because f_{0 dB} / f_{1} = βA_{0} ≫ 1, the term in f_{1} is 90°. That makes the phase margin:

$$\begin{align}
\phi_m &= 90 ^\circ - \arctan ( f_\text{0 dB} /f_2) \\
&= 90 ^\circ -  \arctan \frac {\beta A_0 f_1} {\alpha \beta A_0 f_1 }  \\
&= 90 ^\circ - \arctan \frac {1} {\alpha } = \arctan \alpha \,.
\end{align}$$

In particular, for case α = 1, φ_{m} = 45°, and for α = 2, φ_{m} = 63.4°. Sansen recommends α = 3, φ_{m} = 71.6° as a "good safety position to start with".

If α is increased by shortening τ_{2}, the settling time t_{S} also is shortened. If α is increased by lengthening τ_{1}, the settling time t_{S} is little altered. More commonly, both τ_{1} and τ_{2} change, for example if the technique of pole splitting is used.

As an aside, for an amplifier with more than two poles, the diagram of Figure 5 still may be made to fit the Bode plots by making f_{2} a fitting parameter, referred to as an "equivalent second pole" position.

== See also ==
- Impulse response
- Overshoot (signal)
- Pole splitting
- Rise time
- Settling time
- Time constant
