= Natural frequency =

Frequency at which systems tend to oscillate

Natural frequency, measured in terms of eigenfrequency, is the rate at which an oscillatory system tends to oscillate in the absence of disturbance. A foundational example pertains to simple harmonic oscillators, such as an idealized spring with no energy loss wherein the system exhibits constant-amplitude oscillations with a constant frequency. The phenomenon of resonance occurs when a forced vibration matches a system's natural frequency.

== Overview ==
Free vibrations of an elastic body, also called natural vibrations, occur at the natural frequency. Natural vibrations are different from forced vibrations which happen at the frequency of an applied force (forced frequency). If the forced frequency is equal to the natural frequency, the vibrations' amplitude increases manyfold. This phenomenon is known as resonance, where the system's response to the applied frequency is amplified. A system's normal mode is defined by the oscillation of a natural frequency in a sine waveform.

In analysis of systems, it is convenient to use the angular frequency ω = 2πf rather than the frequency f, or the complex frequency-domain parameter s = σ + ωi.

In a mass–spring system, with mass m and spring stiffness k, the natural angular frequency can be calculated as
$$\omega_0 = \sqrt{\frac{k}{m}}.$$

In an electrical network, ω is a natural angular frequency of a response function f(t) if the Laplace transform F(s) of f(t) includes the term Ke^{−st}, where s = σ + ωi for a real σ, and K ≠ 0 is a constant. Natural frequencies depend on network topology and element values but not their input. It can be shown that the set of natural frequencies in a network can be obtained by calculating the poles of all impedance and admittance functions of the network. A pole of the network transfer function is associated with a natural angular frequencies of the corresponding response variable; however there may exist some natural angular frequency that does not correspond to a pole of the network function. These happen at some special initial states.

In LC and RLC circuits, its natural angular frequency can be calculated as
$$\omega_0 = \frac{1}{\sqrt{LC}}.$$

One way to measure this frequency is to use a ping test, where the object in question is struck with a metallic object and the vibrations are measured.

== See also ==
- Fundamental frequency
