= Damping =

Influence on an oscillating physical system which reduces or prevents its oscillation

Underdamped spring–mass system with ζ < 1

In physical systems, damping is the loss of energy of an oscillating system by dissipation. Damping is an influence within or upon an oscillatory system that has the effect of reducing or preventing its oscillation. Examples of damping include viscous damping in a fluid (see viscous drag), surface friction, radiation, resistance in electronic oscillators, and absorption and scattering of light in optical oscillators. Damping not based on energy loss can be important in other oscillating systems such as those that occur in biological systems and bikes (ex. Suspension (mechanics)). Damping is not to be confused with friction, which is a type of dissipative force acting on a system. Friction can cause or be a factor of damping.

Many systems exhibit oscillatory behavior when they are disturbed from their position of static equilibrium. A mass suspended from a spring, for example, might, if pulled and released, bounce up and down. On each bounce, the system tends to return to its equilibrium position, but overshoots it. Sometimes losses (e.g. frictional) damp the system and can cause the oscillations to gradually decay in amplitude towards zero or attenuate.

The damping ratio is a dimensionless measure, amongst other measures, that characterises how damped a system is. It is denoted by ζ ("zeta") and varies from undamped (ζ = 0), underdamped (0 < ζ < 1) through critically damped (ζ = 1) to overdamped (ζ > 1).

The behaviour of oscillating systems is often of interest in a diverse range of disciplines that include control engineering, chemical engineering, mechanical engineering, structural engineering, and electrical engineering. The physical quantity that is oscillating varies greatly, and could be the swaying of a tall building in the wind, or the speed of an electric motor, but a normalised, or non-dimensionalised approach can be convenient in describing common aspects of behavior.

== Oscillation cases ==
Movement of the needle of a mechanical weighing scale when the mass-spring system within is underdamped, overdamped and critically damped. Critical damping is ideal for this device, because it minimises the time taken for the needle to settle, allowing a reading to be taken sooner.

Depending on the amount of damping present, a system exhibits different oscillatory behaviors and speeds.

- Where the spring–mass system is completely lossless, the mass would oscillate indefinitely, with each bounce of equal height to the last. This hypothetical case is called undamped.
- If the system contained high losses, for example if the spring–mass experiment were conducted in a viscous fluid, the mass could slowly return to its rest position without ever overshooting. This case is called overdamped.
- Commonly, the mass tends to overshoot its starting position, and then return, overshooting again. With each overshoot, some energy in the system is dissipated, and the oscillations die towards zero. This case is called underdamped.
- Between the overdamped and underdamped cases, there exists a certain level of damping at which the system will just fail to overshoot and will not make a single oscillation. This case is called critical damping. The key difference between critical damping and overdamping is that, in critical damping, the system returns to equilibrium in the minimum amount of time.

== Damped sine wave ==
Plot of a damped sinusoidal wave represented as the function $y(t) = e^{- t} \cos(2 \pi t)$

A damped sine wave or damped sinusoid is a sinusoidal function whose amplitude approaches zero as time increases. It corresponds to the underdamped case of damped second-order systems, or underdamped second-order differential equations. Damped sine waves are commonly seen in science and engineering, wherever a harmonic oscillator is losing energy faster than it is being supplied. A true sine wave starting at time = 0 begins at the origin (amplitude = 0). A cosine wave begins at its maximum value due to its phase difference from the sine wave. A given sinusoidal waveform may be of intermediate phase, having both sine and cosine components. The term "damped sine wave" describes all such damped waveforms, whatever their initial phase.

The most common form of damping, which is usually assumed, is the form found in linear systems. This form is exponential damping, in which the outer envelope of the successive peaks is an exponential decay curve. That is, when the maximum points of each successive curve are connected, the result resembles an exponential decay function. The general equation for an exponentially damped sinusoid may be represented as:
$$y(t) = A e^{-\lambda t} \cos(\omega t - \varphi)$$
where:

- $y(t)$ is the instantaneous amplitude at time t;
- $A$ is the initial amplitude of the envelope;
- $\lambda$ is the decay rate, in the reciprocal of the time units of the independent variable t;
- $\varphi$ is the phase angle at t = 0;
- $\omega$ is the angular frequency.

Other important parameters include:

- Frequency: $f = \omega / (2\pi)$, the number of cycles per time unit. It is expressed in inverse time units $t^{-1}$, or hertz.
- Time constant: $\tau = 1 / \lambda$, the time for the amplitude to decrease by the factor of e.
- Half-life is the time it takes for the exponential amplitude envelope to decrease by a factor of 2. It is equal to $\ln(2) / \lambda$ which is approximately $0.693 / \lambda$.
- Damping ratio: $\zeta$ is a non-dimensional characterization of the decay rate relative to the frequency, approximately $\zeta = \lambda / \omega$, or exactly $\zeta = \lambda / \sqrt{\lambda^2 + \omega^2} < 1$.
- Q factor: $Q = 1 / (2 \zeta)$ is another non-dimensional characterization of the amount of damping; high Q indicates slow damping relative to the oscillation.

== Damping ratio ==
The effect of varying damping ratio on a second-order system.

The damping ratio is a dimensionless parameter, usually denoted by ζ (Greek letter zeta), that characterizes the extent of damping in a second-order ordinary differential equation. It is particularly important in the study of control theory. It is also important in the harmonic oscillator. The greater the damping ratio, the more damped a system is.

- Undamped systems have a damping ratio of 0.
- Underdamped systems have a value of less than one.
- Critically damped systems have a damping ratio of 1.
- Overdamped systems have a damping ratio greater than 1.

The damping ratio expresses the level of damping in a system relative to critical damping and can be defined using the damping coefficient:

$$\zeta = \frac{c}{c_c} = \frac {\text{actual damping}} {\text{critical damping}},$$

The damping ratio is dimensionless, being the ratio of two coefficients of identical units.

Taking the simple example of a mass-spring-damper model with mass m, damping coefficient c, and spring constant k, where $x$ represents the degree of freedom, the system's equation of motion is given by:

$m\ddot{x} + c\dot{x} + kx = 0$.

The corresponding critical damping coefficient is: $c_c = 2 \sqrt{k m}$

and the natural frequency of the system is: $\omega_n = \sqrt{\frac{k}{m}}$

Using these definitions, the equation of motion can then be expressed as:

$$\ddot{x} + 2\zeta\omega_n\dot{x} + \omega_n^2 x = 0.$$

This equation is more general than just the mass-spring-damper system and applies to electrical circuits and to other domains. It can be solved with the approach

$$x(t) = C e^{s t},$$

where C and s are both complex constants, with s satisfying

$$s = -\omega_n \left(\zeta \pm i \sqrt{1 - \zeta^2}\right).$$

Two such solutions, for the two values of s satisfying the equation, can be combined to make the general real solutions, with oscillatory and decaying properties in several regimes:

Phase portrait of damped oscillator, with increasing damping strength. It starts at undamped, proceeds to underdamped, then critically damped, then overdamped.

Undamped
Is the case where $\zeta = 0$ corresponds to the undamped simple harmonic oscillator, and in that case the solution looks like $\exp(i\omega_nt)$, as expected. This case is extremely rare in the natural world with the closest examples being cases where friction was purposefully reduced to minimal values.
Underdamped
If s is a pair of complex values, then each complex solution term is a decaying exponential combined with an oscillatory portion that looks like $\exp\left(i \omega_n \sqrt{1 - \zeta^2}t\right)$. This case occurs for $\ 0 \le \zeta < 1$, and is referred to as underdamped (e.g., bungee cable).
Overdamped
If s is a pair of real values, then the solution is simply a sum of two decaying exponentials with no oscillation. This case occurs for $\zeta > 1$, and is referred to as overdamped.
Critically damped
The case where $\zeta = 1$ is the border between the overdamped and underdamped cases, and is referred to as critically damped. This turns out to be a desirable outcome in many cases where engineering design of a damped oscillator is required (e.g., a door closing mechanism).

== Q factor and decay rate ==
The Q factor, damping ratio ζ, and exponential decay rate α are related such that

$$\zeta = \frac{1}{2 Q} = { \alpha \over \omega_n }.$$

When a second-order system has $\zeta < 1$ (that is, when the system is underdamped), it has two complex conjugate poles that each have a real part of $-\alpha$; that is, the decay rate parameter represents the rate of exponential decay of the oscillations. A lower damping ratio implies a lower decay rate, and so very underdamped systems oscillate for long times. For example, a high quality tuning fork, which has a very low damping ratio, has an oscillation that lasts a long time, decaying very slowly after being struck by a hammer.

== Logarithmic decrement ==

For underdamped vibrations, the damping ratio is also related to the logarithmic decrement $\delta$. The damping ratio can be found for any two peaks, even if they are not adjacent. For adjacent peaks:

$\zeta = \frac{\delta}{\sqrt{\delta^2 + \left(2\pi\right)^2}}$ where $\delta = \ln\frac{x_0}{x_1}$

where x_{0} and x_{1} are amplitudes of any two successive peaks.

As shown in the right figure:

$$\delta = \ln\frac{x_1}{x_3}=\ln\frac{x_2}{x_4}=\ln\frac{x_1-x_2}{x_3-x_4}$$

where $x_1$, $x_3$ are amplitudes of two successive positive peaks and $x_2$, $x_4$ are amplitudes of two successive negative peaks.

== Percentage overshoot ==
In control theory, overshoot refers to an output exceeding its final, steady-state value. For a step input, the percentage overshoot (PO) is the maximum value minus the step value divided by the step value. In the case of the unit step, the overshoot is just the maximum value of the step response minus one.

The percentage overshoot (PO) is related to damping ratio (ζ) by:

$$\mathrm{PO} = 100 \exp \left({-\frac{\zeta\pi}{\sqrt{1-\zeta^2}}}\right)$$

Conversely, the damping ratio (ζ) that yields a given percentage overshoot is given by:

$$\zeta = \frac{-\ln\left(\frac{\rm PO}{100}\right)}{\sqrt{\pi^2 + \ln^2\left(\frac{\rm PO}{100}\right)}}$$

== Examples and applications ==
=== Viscous drag ===
When an object is falling through the air, the only force opposing its freefall is air resistance. An object falling through water or oil would slow down at a greater rate, until eventually reaching a steady-state velocity as the drag force comes into equilibrium with the force from gravity. This is the concept of viscous drag, which for example is applied in automatic doors or anti-slam doors.

=== Damping in electrical systems ===
Electrical systems that operate with alternating current (AC) use resistors to damp LC resonant circuits.

=== Magnetic damping ===
Kinetic energy that causes oscillations is dissipated as heat by electric eddy currents which are induced by passing through a magnet's poles, either by a coil or aluminum plate. Eddy currents are a key component of electromagnetic induction where they set up a magnetic flux directly opposing the oscillating movement, creating a resistive force. In other words, the resistance caused by magnetic forces slows a system down. An example of this concept being applied is the brakes on roller coasters.

=== Magnetorheological damping ===
Magnetorheological dampers (MR Dampers) use Magnetorheological fluid, which changes viscosity when subjected to a magnetic field. In this case, Magnetorheological damping may be considered an interdisciplinary form of damping with both viscous and magnetic damping mechanisms.

=== Material damping ===
Materials have varying degrees of internal damping properties due to microstructural mechanisms within them. This property is sometimes known as damping capacity. In metals, this arises due to movements of dislocations, as demonstrated nicely in this video: metals, as well as ceramics and glass, are known for having very light material damping. By contrast, polymers have a much higher material damping that arises from the energy loss required to contiually break and reform the Van der Waals forces between polymer chains. The cross-linking in thermoset plastics causes less movement of the polymer chains and so the damping is less.

Material damping is best characterized by the loss factor $\eta$, given by the equation below for the case of very light damping, such as in metals or ceramics:

$$\eta = 2\zeta\frac{\omega}{\omega_n}$$

This is because many microstructural processes that contribute to material damping are not well modelled by viscous damping, and so the damping ratio varies with frequency. Adding the frequency ratio as a factor typically makes the loss factor constant over a wide frequency range.
