= Hannovera =

Hannovera refers to two different fencing student fratiernities in Göttingen, Germany:

- Burschenschaft Hannovera
- Corps Hannovera Göttingen
