= Tylos (crustacean) =

- Tylos granulatus from South Africa

Scientific classification
- Kingdom: Animalia
- Phylum: Arthropoda
- Clade: Pancrustacea
- Class: Malacostraca
- Order: Isopoda
- Suborder: Oniscidea
- Family: Tylidae
- Genus: Tylos; Audouin, 1826

Type species
- Tylos latreillii Audouin, 1826

Synonyms
- Rhacodes C. Koch in Rosenhauer, 1856; Tylos (Paratylos) Verhoeff, 1949

Genus of woodlice

Tylos is a genus of woodlice in the family Tylidae. All the species in this family can roll up into a perfect ball and live on sandy beaches.

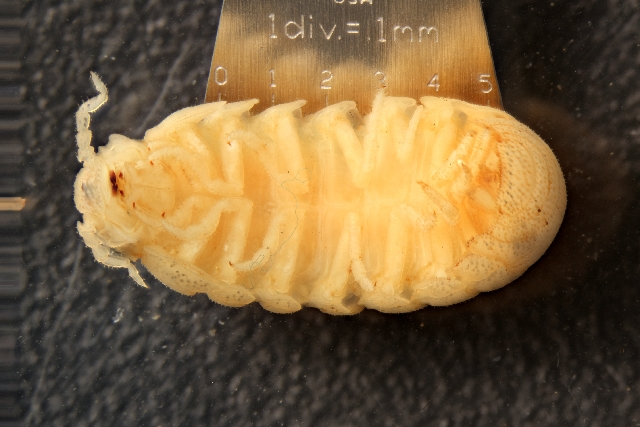
Tylos punctatus

== Description ==
Members of the genus Tylos can curl up into a ball like many other isopod families. It can be distinguished from its sister genus Helleria by the pleon segments being free from each other and the prescense of shelf-like phylacomeres on the underside of the pleon.

== Species ==
There are 22 recognized species:

- Tylos albidus Budde-Lund, 1885
- Tylos australis Lewis & Bishop, 1990
- Tylos capensis Krauss, 1843
- Tylos chilensis Schultz, 1983
- Tylos europaeus Arcangeli, 1938
- Tylos exiguus Stebbing, 1910
- Tylos granulatus Krauss, 1843
- Tylos granuliferus Budde-Lund, 1885
- Tylos madeirae Arcangeli, 1938
- Tylos maindroni Giordani Soika, 1954
- Tylos marcuzzii Giordani Soika, 1954
- Tylos minor Dollfus, 1893
- Tylos negroi López-Orozco, Carpio-Díaz & Campos-Filho, 2022
- Tylos neozelanicus Chilton, 1901
- Tylos niveus Budde-Lund, 1885
- Tylos nudulus Budde-Lund, 1906
- Tylos opercularis Budde-Lund, 1885
- Tylos ponticus Grebnitzky, 1873
- Tylos punctatus Holmes & Gay, 1909
- Tylos spinulosus Dana, 1853
- Tylos tantabiddy Lewis, 1991
- Tylos wegeneri Vandel, 1952
