= Karl Johann Kiessling =

German physicist, mathematician and botanist (1839–1905)

Karl Johann Kiessling (6 February 1839 – 22 July 1905) was a German physicist, mathematician, and botanist born in Culm; today Chełmno, Poland.

== Biography ==
Karl Johann Hermann Kiessling studied at Göttingen, where he became member of Burschenschaft Hannovera (fraternity) and later was a well known Physiklehrer (physics teacher) in the later half or the 19th century. Along with physics, he instructed students in the fields of chemistry, mathematics, and natural science (botany). The majority of his teaching career was held at the Gelehrtenschule des Johanneums, along with his elder brother Adolf Kiessling in Hamburg, Germany.

Kiessling gained notoriety when he became intrigued by the twilight glow phenomena (Bishop's Ring) in the early morning and late evening skies over northern Europe during the winter of 1883/84. He had postulated, like others, that this was likely the result of the 26 August 1883 catastrophic eruption of the volcano Krakatoa located in Indonesia, east of Java. Kiessling proceeded to replicate the effect through laboratory experimentation. He designed and built a fog chamber in which he introduced precise amounts of dust and water vapour suspended in the gases within the chamber, and directed broad spectrum light through the mist.

Kiessling's experimental results and documentation were successful and advanced the theories of meteorology as well as contributed to the development of the cloud chamber by Charles Thomson Rees Wilson used in particle physics to detect the paths of radioactive particles.

Kiessling's work was recognized throughout the scientific community and mention of it was given in numerous scientific periodicals and journals in Europe and the United States.

The Warner Observatory in Rochester, New York USA awarded Kiessling in 1886 with first prize for best 3000 word essay on the topic of the “Red-Sky glows” phenomena.

=== Education and career ===
Johann Kiessling attended the Dom Gymnasium in Naumburg. Between the years 1858 and 1863 he studied mathematics and natural sciences in Göttingen, Halle and Königsberg. Between 1861 and 1863 at Konigsberg, he spent his last four semesters attending the seminars of Franz Ernst Neumann.

Kiessling graduated pro facultate docendi in 1864, in mathematics, physics and mineralogy. Before he took the state teaching examination in Berlin in 1864, he assisted in teaching the upper classes at the Kneiphofisches Gymnasium in Konigsberg. Kiessling spent his probationary year at the Joachimsthalsches Gymnasium in Berlin, where his uncle Gustav Kiessling (1809–1884) was director and later provincial school counsellor. While there he joined the Berlin Physical Society and worked in Magnus's laboratory (see Heinrich Gustav Magnus). Following a supplementary examination in zoology and botany, he was sent in 1867 to Flensburg (Schleswig-Holstein), to the new Prussian state province. There he entered military service. In 1870 he was appointed to the Gelehrtenschule des Johanneums in Hamburg where is brother Adolf Kiessling had already taught for a year. But before he could begin he was drafted into the Franco-Prussian War. He finally began teaching there in 1871, remaining at the school until his retirement in 1902. Johann Kiessling then moved to Marburg, where he could remain involved with that city's.scientific community.
