= Dexamine spinosa =

Scientific classification
- Kingdom: Animalia
- Phylum: Arthropoda
- Clade: Pancrustacea
- Class: Malacostraca
- Order: Amphipoda
- Family: Dexaminidae
- Genus: Dexamine
- Species: D. spinosa

Binomial name
- Dexamine spinosa (Montagu, 1813)

Species of amphipod

Dexamine spinosa is a species of amphipod.
