= Alexander Mitscherlich =

Alexander Mitscherlich may refer to:

- Alexander Mitscherlich (chemist) (1836–1918), German chemist
- Alexander Mitscherlich (psychologist) (1908–1982), German psychoanalyst
