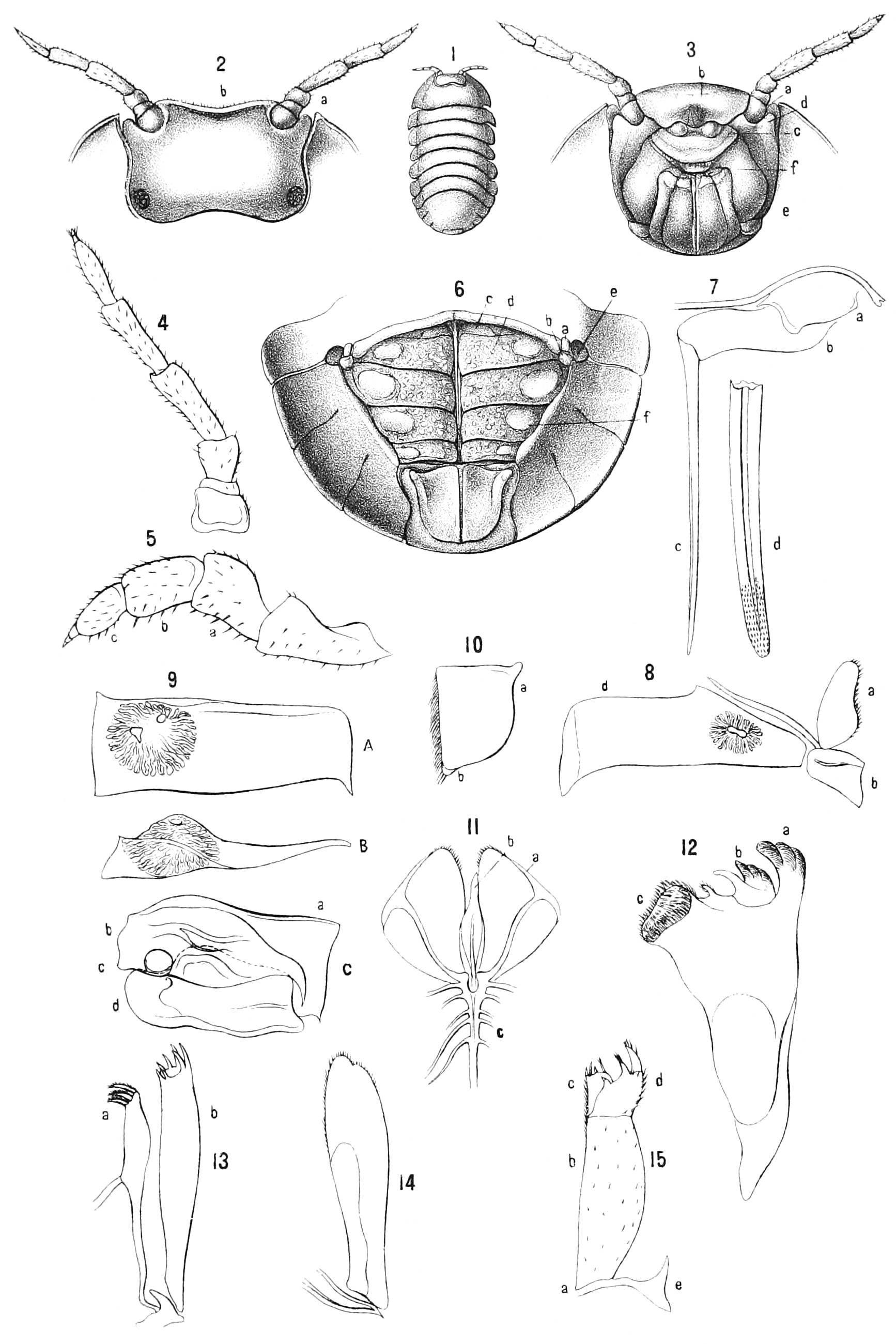
- Plate from first published description

Scientific classification
- Kingdom: Animalia
- Phylum: Arthropoda
- Clade: Pancrustacea
- Class: Malacostraca
- Order: Isopoda
- Suborder: Oniscidea
- Family: Tylidae
- Genus: Helleria; Ebner, 1868
- Species: H. brevicornis

Binomial name
- Helleria brevicornis Ebner, 1868
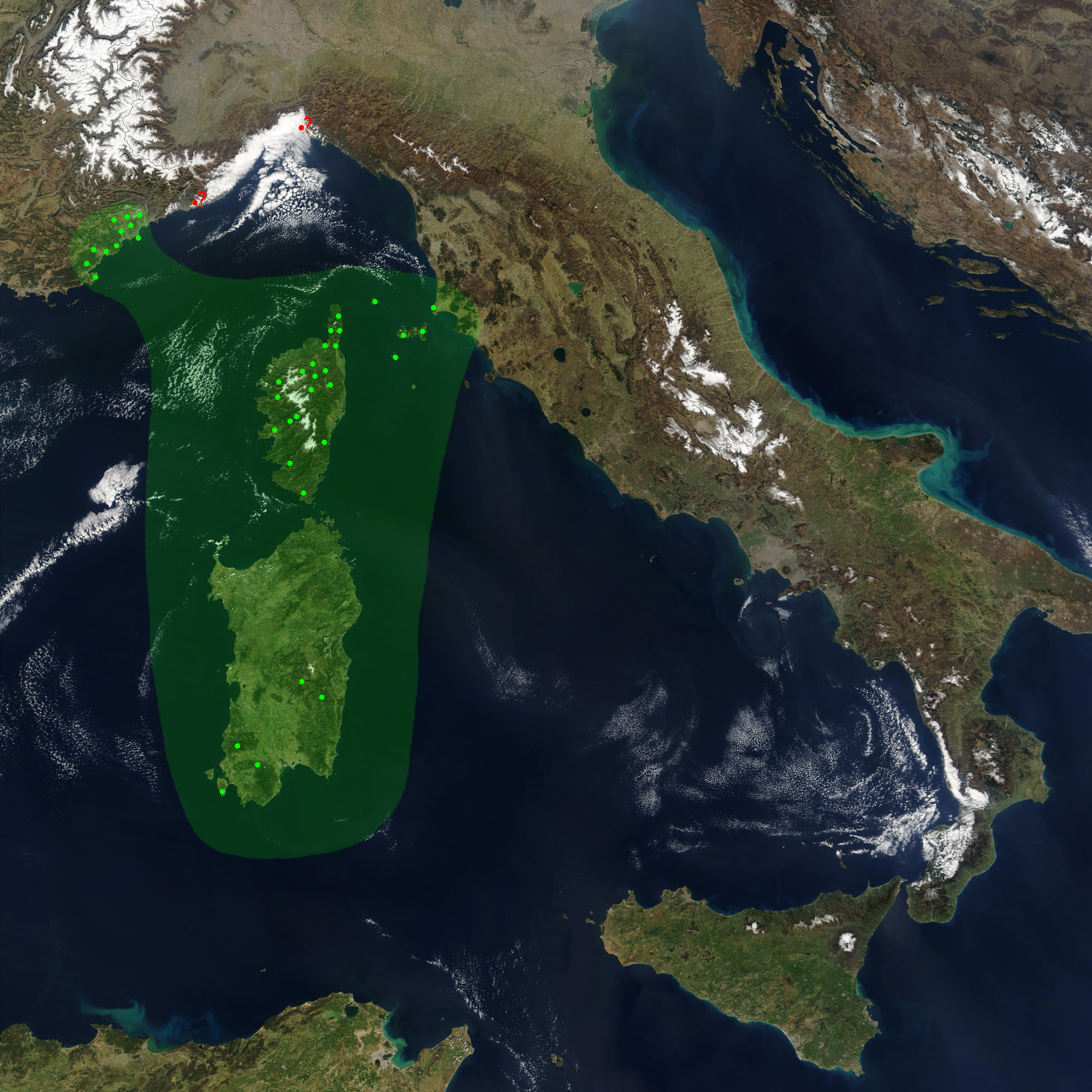

Synonyms
- Syspastus brevicornis Ebner, 1868; Syspastus brevicornis Budde-Lund, 1879; Synlomogaster dasypus Costa, 1882; Syngastron dasypus Costa, 1883; Syspastus sardous Verhoeff, 1908

= Helleria brevicornis =

Species of woodlice

Helleria brevicornis, the sole species of the monotypic genus Helleria, is a terrestrial woodlouse endemic to the islands and coastal regions of the northern Tyrrhenian sea. H. brevicornis is of interest due to its endemism, unique ecology and basal position in the suborder Oniscidea.

== Description ==
H. brevicornis is yellow-brown in colour and grows up to 27 millimetres (1.1 in) in length. This species has vestigial antennules, short antennae and a trapezoid telson. Each of its compound eyes consist of 19 ommatidia. Juveniles have bumps and setae while adults are almost smooth with light spots. In adults the plates of the posterior (pleonites) fuse with each other after moulting. Like all other members of the family Tylidae, it is capable of rolling up into a perfect ball with antennas tucked in.

== Distribution ==
The species is found primarily in the oak forests of Corsica, from coastal areas up to an altitude of 1,200 metres (3,900 ft) above sea level, and on Sardinia. It is also known to occur in isolated locations on islands of the Tuscan Archipelago (Elba, Pianosa & Capraia), the Lérins Islands, the Italian coast (Monte Massoncello) the French coast (Massif de l'Estérel & Grasse region) up to an altitude of 600 metres (2,000 ft) above sea level. Records of this species at Genoa and at Ospedaletti are uncorroborated. A molecular phylogenetic analysis found that the colonisation of the French and Italian mainland and of the Tuscan Archipelago occurred most recently but failed to conclusively determine whether the distribution was caused by climate change during the Late Pleistocene period or through accidental human transportation of the species.

== Ecology ==
A detritivore, H. brevicornis lives amongst and feeds on the leaf litter and humus layers of forests soils and is known to dig burrows 10 centimetres (3.9 in) deep. It is found living in large subsocial groups and is known to engage in conspecific coprophagy. Like other peracarids, females of H. brevicornis provide developing embryos with water, oxygen and nutrients through a specialised structure known as the marsupium. Unlike many other terrestrial isopods, H. brevicornis females lack a seminal receptacle. This means that they cannot store sperm, and must breed with a male every time they want to produce a new brood of young. In contrast, most other terrestrial isopod females do possess a seminal receptacle, and can therefore produce multiple broods after breeding only once. The hindgut of H. brevicornis is host to the mesomycetozoean parasite Eccrinoides helleriae.

=== Mate guarding ===
H. brevicornis has followed a unique evolutionary path among terrestrial isopods, and is the only fully terrestrial isopod that has retained the ancestral behaviour of mate guarding which has been observed in all aquatic isopods and some supralittoral species of the genus Ligia. During the breeding period, a male will guard a female who is about to become sexually receptive by riding on top of and tightly gripping her. This precopulatory mate guarding begins 1 to 20 days before the parturial moult of the female. Copulation occurs within 5 to 12 hours after the female sheds the posterior part of her exoskeleton. The male continues the 'nuptial ride' after mating and stops when the female lays fertilised eggs in her newly formed marsupium.

== Taxonomic history ==
The genus Helleria and type species Helleria brevicornis were first described by Dr. Victor von Ebner, in a publication dated 8 January 1868, from a specimen collected in Corsica. He named the genus Helleria after his friend Camill Heller, who was known for his work on crustacean anatomy, and the specific epithet brevicornis after the Latin for 'short-horned' in reference to the woodlouse's short antennae. Later that year, in a journal published in December, Rev. Alfred Norman described a new genus of amphipods which he also named Helleria, which would eventually be renamed Guernea. In 1879 Gustav Budde-Lund declared Helleria brevicornis a junior synonym to Syspastus brevicornis, a name which he popularised in his seminal 1885 catalog of terrestrial isopods. Meanwhile, Achille Costa had named a woodlouse he found in Sardinia in 1882 Synlomagaster dasypus and subsequently Syngastron dasypus in 1883 but subsequent investigation showed it to be the same as H. brevicornis. While other authors had previously pointed out the precedence of von Ebner's publication, an 1893 book by Rev. Thomas Stebbing ensured subsequent authors (with the notable exception of Karl Verhoeff) used Helleria brevicornis Ebner to describe this woodlouse.

Since it was first described, some authors had placed Helleria and Tylos in the same family while others had separated them into two different families. The current taxonomy of placing the two genera in the family Tylidae has persisted since 1960 with Albert Vandel's publication of Isopodes terrestres.
