= Antiresonance =

Frequencies in coupled oscillators

In the physics of coupled oscillators, antiresonance, by analogy with resonance, is a pronounced minimum in the amplitude of an oscillator at a particular frequency, accompanied by a large, abrupt shift in its oscillation phase. Such frequencies are known as the system's antiresonant frequencies, and at these frequencies the oscillation amplitude can drop to almost zero. Antiresonances are caused by destructive interference, for example between an external driving force and interaction with another oscillator.

Antiresonances can occur in all types of coupled oscillator systems, including mechanical, acoustical, electromagnetic, and quantum systems. They have important applications in the characterization of complicated coupled systems.

The term antiresonance is used in electrical engineering for a even-numbered resonances in single oscillators that have similar effects.

== Antiresonance in electrical engineering ==
In electrical engineering, antiresonance is the condition for which the reactance vanishes but the resistive impedance of an electrical circuit is none the less very high, approaching infinity.

In an electric circuit consisting of a capacitor and an inductor in parallel, antiresonance occurs when the alternating current line voltage and the resultant current are in phase. Under these conditions the line current is very small because of the high electrical impedance of the parallel circuit at antiresonance. The branch currents are almost equal in magnitude and opposite in phase.

== Antiresonance in coupled oscillators ==
Steady-state amplitude and phase of two coupled harmonic oscillators as a function of frequency.

The simplest system in which antiresonance arises is a system of coupled harmonic oscillators, for example pendula or RLC circuits.

Consider two harmonic oscillators coupled together with strength g and with one oscillator driven by an oscillating external force F. The situation is described by the coupled ordinary differential equations

$$\begin{align}
\ddot{x}_1 + 2\gamma_1 \dot{x}_1 - 2g \omega_1 x_2 + \omega_1^2 x_1 &= 2F\cos\omega t \\
\ddot{x}_2 + 2\gamma_2 \dot{x}_2 - 2g \omega_2 x_1 + \omega_2^2 x_2 &= 0
\end{align}$$

where the ω_{i} represent the resonance frequencies of the two oscillators and the γ_{i} their damping rates. Changing variables to the complex parameters:

$$\begin{align}
\alpha_1 &= \omega_1 x_1 + i\frac{p_1}{m_1}\\
\alpha_2 &= \omega_2 x_2 + i\frac{p_2}{m_1}
\end{align}$$

allows us to write these as first-order equations:

$$\begin{align}
\dot{\alpha}_1 &= i\omega_1 \alpha_1 - \gamma_1(\alpha_1 - \alpha_1^*) - ig\tfrac{\omega_1}{\omega_2}(\alpha_2 + \alpha_2^*) + iF(e^{i\omega t}+e^{-i\omega t}) \\
\dot{\alpha}_2 &= i\omega_2 \alpha_2 - \gamma_2(\alpha_2 - \alpha_2^*) - ig\tfrac{\omega_2}{\omega_1}(\alpha_1 + \alpha_1^*)
\end{align}$$

We transform to a frame rotating at the driving frequency

$$\alpha_i \rightarrow \alpha_i e^{-i\omega t}$$

yielding

$$\begin{align}
\dot{\alpha}_1 &= i\Delta_1 \alpha_1 - \gamma_1(\alpha_1 - \alpha_1^* e^{2i\omega t}) - ig\tfrac{\omega_1}{\omega_2}(\alpha_2 + \alpha_2^* e^{2i\omega t}) + iF(1+e^{2i\omega t}) \\
\dot{\alpha}_2 &= i\Delta_2 \alpha_2 - \gamma_2(\alpha_2 - \alpha_2^* e^{2i\omega t}) - ig\tfrac{\omega_2}{\omega_1}(\alpha_1 + \alpha_1^* e^{2i\omega t})
\end{align}$$

where we have introduced the detunings Δ_{i} = ω − ω_{i} between the drive and the oscillators' resonance frequencies. Finally, we make a rotating wave approximation, neglecting the fast counter-rotating terms proportional to e^{2iωt}, which average to zero over the timescales we are interested in (this approximation assumes that ω + ω_{i} ≫ ω − ω_{i}, which is reasonable for small frequency ranges around the resonances). Thus we obtain:

$$\begin{align}
\dot{\alpha}_1 &= i (\Delta_1 + i\gamma_1) \alpha_1 - ig\tfrac{\omega_1}{\omega_2}\alpha_2 + iF \\
\dot{\alpha}_2 &= i (\Delta_2 + i\gamma_2) \alpha_2 - ig\tfrac{\omega_2}{\omega_1}\alpha_1
\end{align}$$

Without damping, driving or coupling, the solutions to these equations are:

$$\alpha_i(t) = \alpha_i(0) e^{i\Delta t}$$

which represent a rotation in the complex α plane with angular frequency Δ.

The steady-state solution can be found by setting $\dot{\alpha}_1 = \dot{\alpha}_2 = 0$, which gives:

$$\begin{align}
\alpha_{1,ss} &= \frac{-F(\Delta_2 + i\gamma_2)}{(\Delta_1 + i\gamma_1)(\Delta_2 + i\gamma_2)-g^2} \\
\alpha_{2,ss} &= \frac{\omega_2}{\omega_1}\dfrac{-Fg}{(\Delta_1+ i\gamma_1)(\Delta_2 + i\gamma_2)-g^2}
\end{align}$$

Examining these steady state solutions as a function of driving frequency, it is evident that both oscillators display resonances (peaks in amplitude accompanied by positive phase shifts) at the two normal mode frequencies. In addition, the driven oscillator displays a pronounced dip in amplitude between the normal modes which is accompanied by a negative phase shift. This is the antiresonance. Note that there is no antiresonance in the undriven oscillator's spectrum; although its amplitude has a minimum between the normal modes, there is no pronounced dip or negative phase shift.

== Interpretation as destructive interference ==
Animation showing time evolution to the antiresonant steady-state of two coupled pendula. The red arrow represents a driving force acting on the left pendulum.

The reduced oscillation amplitude at an antiresonance can be regarded as due to destructive interference or cancellation of forces acting on the oscillator.

In the above example, at the antiresonance frequency the external driving force F acting on oscillator 1 cancels the force acting via the coupling to oscillator 2, causing oscillator 1 to remain almost stationary.

== Complicated coupled systems ==
Example frequency-response function of a dynamical system with several degrees of freedom, showing distinct resonance-antiresonance behavior in both amplitude and phase.

The frequency response function (FRF) of any linear dynamic system composed of many coupled components will in general display distinctive resonance-antiresonance behavior when driven.

As a rule of thumb, it can be stated that as the distance between the driven component and the measured component increases, the number of antiresonances in the FRF decreases. For example, in the two-oscillator situation above, the FRF of the undriven oscillator displayed no antiresonance. Resonances and antiresonances only alternate continuously in the FRF of the driven component itself.

== Applications ==
An important result in the theory of antiresonances is that they can be interpreted as the resonances of the system fixed at the excitation point. This can be seen in the pendulum animation above: the steady-state antiresonant situation is the same as if the left pendulum were fixed and could not oscillate. An important corollary of this result is that the antiresonances of a system are independent of the properties of the driven oscillator; that is, they do not change if the resonance frequency or damping coefficient of the driven oscillator are altered.

This result makes antiresonances useful in characterizing complex coupled systems which cannot be easily separated into their constituent components. The resonance frequencies of the system depend on the properties of all components and their couplings, and are independent of which is driven. The antiresonances, on the other hand, are dependent upon everything except the component being driven, therefore providing information about how it affects the total system. By driving each component in turn, information about all of the individual subsystems can be obtained, despite the couplings between them. This technique has applications in mechanical engineering, structural analysis, and the design of integrated quantum circuits.

In electrical engineering antiresonance is used in wave traps, which are sometimes inserted in series with antennas of radio receivers to block the flow of alternating current at the frequency of an interfering station, while allowing other frequencies to pass.

In nanomechanical systems, the sideband spectra of a driven nonlinear mode with its eigenfrequency being modulated at a low frequency (<1 kHz) shows prominent antiresonance line shapes in the power spectra, which can be controlled through the vibration state. The antiresonance frequency can be utilized to characterize the thermal fluctuation and the squeezing parameter of the nonlinear system.

== See also ==
- Resonance
- Oscillator
- Resonance (alternating-current circuits)
- Tuned mass damper
- Fano resonance
