= Tylidae =

- Tylos granulatus from South Africa

Scientific classification
- Kingdom: Animalia
- Phylum: Arthropoda
- Clade: Pancrustacea
- Class: Malacostraca
- Order: Isopoda
- Suborder: Oniscidea
- Infraorder: Tylomorpha; Vandel, 1943
- Family: Tylidae; Dana, 1852

Type genus
- Tylos Audouin, 1826

Genera
- Helleria Ebner, 1868; Tylos Audouin, 1826

Family of woodlice

Tylidae is a family of woodlice. It contains 23 species, all but one in the genus Tylos, the other being Helleria brevicornis. Together with the family Ligiidae, Tylidae appears to have diverged early from the extant woodlouse families.

== Evolution ==
Tylidae is one of the oldest unambiguously identified land isopod families, with amber inclusions dating back to the Cenomanian appearing similar to modern members. Certain populations of the species Helleria brevicornis have been separated since the Early Pliocene.

2014 phylogeny of the family:

- Helleria
  Helleria brevicornis
- Tylos
  - - Tylos chilensis
    - Tylos spinulosus
  - - Tylos wegeneri
    - - - Tylos neozealanicus
        - - Tylos opercularis
          - Tylos granuliferus
          - Tylos minor
        - Tylos albidus
      - - - Tylos exiguus
          - Tylos maindroni
        - - - - Tylos ponticus
              - Tylos europaeus
            - - Tylos capensis
              - Tylos granulatus
          - - Tylos marcuzzi
            - - Tylos niveus
              - Tylos punctatus
