= Wilhelm Lübke =

German art historian (1826–1893)

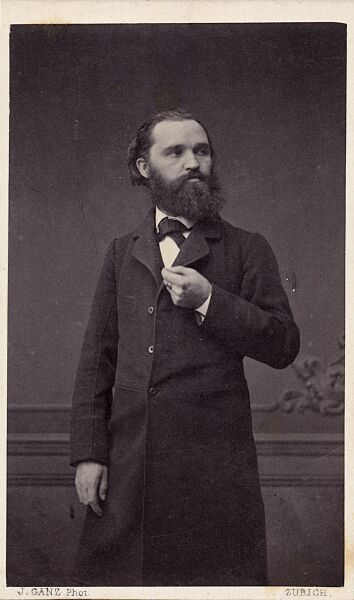
- Born: January 17, 1826
- Died: April 5, 1894 (aged 68)
- Occupation: Art historian

Academic background
- Education: University of Bonn; Humboldt University of Berlin

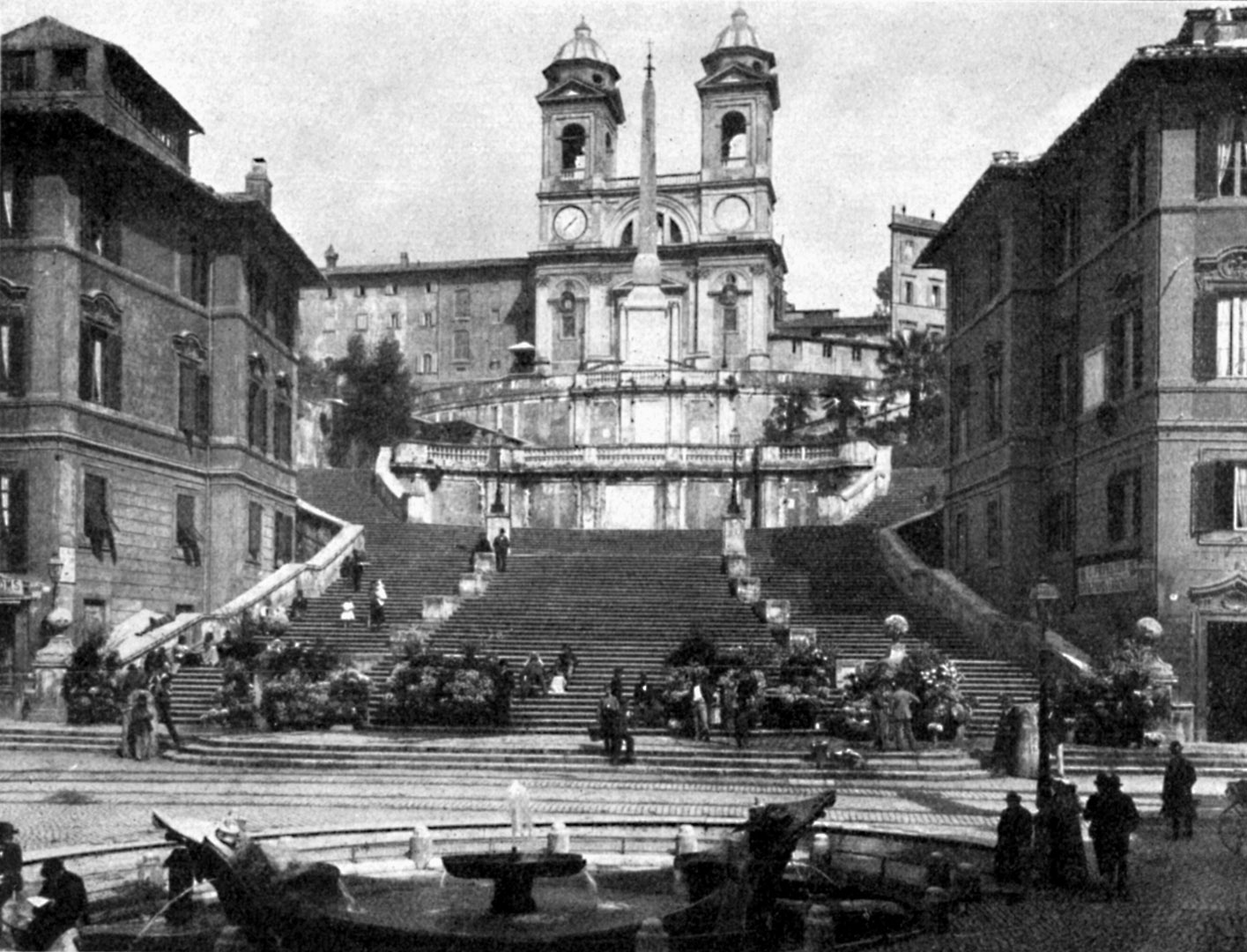
The Spanish Steps in Rome around 1900. Book illustration from Wilhelm Lübke's Grundriß der Kunstgeschichte (14th edition, with contributions from Max Semrau.) Paul Neff Verlag. Berlin 1908.

Wilhelm Lübke (17 January 1826 – 5 April 1893) was a German art historian, born in Dortmund.

He studied at Bonn and Berlin; was a professor of architecture at the Berlin Bauakademie (1857–61) and a professor of art history at the Polytechnic in Zurich (1861–66), the Polytechnic in Stuttgart (1866–85), and the Technische Hochschule in Karlsruhe (1885–93). Previous to his work in art, he gave instruction in vocal and pianoforte music.

Lübke was one of the pioneer writers on art history in Germany. His works were for their day both scholarly and appreciative, and correlate the epochs of art history with the great historical periods.

== Selective bibliography ==
Lübke wrote, in a comprehensive and readable style, numerous valuable works, including:

- Vorschule vor Geschichte der Kirchenbaukunst des Mittelalters (1852; sixth edition, under different title, 1873; English translation, Ecclesiastical Art in Germany during the Middle Ages, Edinburgh, 1870).
- Mittelalterliche Kunst in Westfalen, 1853 ("Medieval art in Westphalia").
- Geschichte der Architektur, (Leipzig, 1855; sixth edition, 1884–86).
- Grundriß der Kunstgeschichte (1860; thirteenth edition, 1899–1907; English translation, under the title Outlines of the History of Art by Clarence Cook, 1878, and reëdited by Russell Sturgis, New York, 1904).
- Geschichte der Renaissance Frankreichs, 1868 ("History of the Renaissance in France").
- Geschichte der deutschen Renaissance, 1873 ("History of the German Renaissance").
- Geschichte der Plastik (third edition, 1880; translation by F.E. Bunnet under the title History of Sculpture, London, 1878).
- Geschichte der deutschen Kunst von den frühesten Zeiten bis zur Gegenwart, 1890 ("History of German art: from the earliest times to the present").
- Lebenserinnerungen, 1891 ("Recollections").

With Karl von Lützow, he published Denkmäler der Kunst, later translated into English and issued as Monuments of art, showing its development and progress from the earliest artistic attempts to the present period.
