= Adolf Kiessling =

German classical philologist (1837–1893)

Adolf Kiessling (15 February 1837 – 3 May 1893) was a German philologist born in Culm (present-day Chełmno, Poland). He was a specialist in the field of Roman literature.

== Biography ==
He obtained his classical education at the University of Bonn as a student of Friedrich Gottlieb Welcker, Friedrich Wilhelm Ritschl, Franz Bücheler and Otto Jahn. In 1863, he became a professor of classical philology at the University of Basel, and in 1869 began teaching classes at the Gelehrtenschule des Johanneums in Hamburg. In 1872 he relocated to the University of Greifswald, where from a scientific standpoint, he spent the most important years of his life. In 1889 he became successor to Friedrich Leo (1851–1914) at the University of Strasbourg.

== Works ==
Kiessling's research largely dealt with critiques and commentaries of ancient classical texts. His best written effort being an extensive commentary on the works of Horace, a work that appeared in three volumes from 1884 to 1889, and after Kiessling's death, was edited by Richard Heinze (1867–1929).

- "Quintus Horatius Flaccus ad lectiones probatiores diligenter emendatus, et interpunctione nova saepius illustratus"
  - Book I: "Oden und Epoden"
  - Book II: "Satiren"
  - Book III: "Briefe".

He also explained and critiqued the writings of the historian Ammianus Marcellinus, the philosopher Seneca, the playwright Plautus and the poets Catullus and Propertius. Other noted published works by Kiessling include:

- Philologische Untersuchungen (Philological studies, with Ulrich von Wilamowitz-Moellendorff).
- "Dionysi Halicarnasensis Antiquitatum Romanarum quae supersunt", 1867.
- Aristoteles Schrift vom Staatswesen der Athener, (German translation with Georg Kaibel) 1891.
