= Tylos granulatus =

Conservation status
- Endangered (IUCN 3.1)

Scientific classification
- Kingdom: Animalia
- Phylum: Arthropoda
- Clade: Pancrustacea
- Class: Malacostraca
- Order: Isopoda
- Suborder: Oniscidea
- Family: Tylidae
- Genus: Tylos
- Species: T. granulatus

Binomial name
- Tylos granulatus Krauss, 1843

Species of crustacean

Tylos granulatus is a species of isopod in the family Tylidae. It is found in Africa. It is a sandy-beach isopod incapable of burrowing in totally dry sand.
