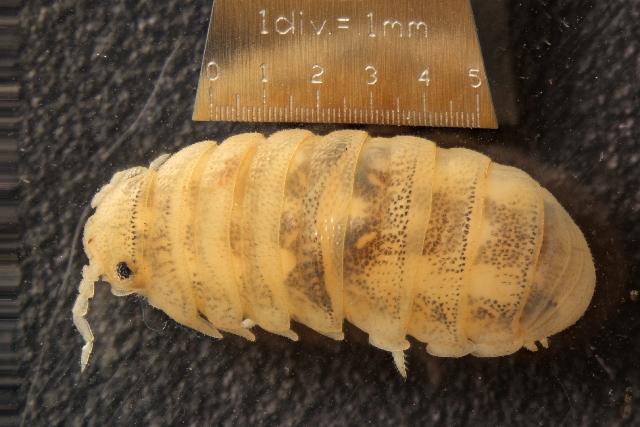

Scientific classification
- Kingdom: Animalia
- Phylum: Arthropoda
- Class: Malacostraca
- Order: Isopoda
- Suborder: Oniscidea
- Family: Tylidae
- Genus: Tylos
- Species: T. punctatus

Binomial name
- Tylos punctatus Holmes & Gay, 1909

= Tylos punctatus =

Species of woodlouse

Tylos punctatus is a species of woodlouse in the family Tylidae. It is found in Central America, North America, South America, and Mexico.

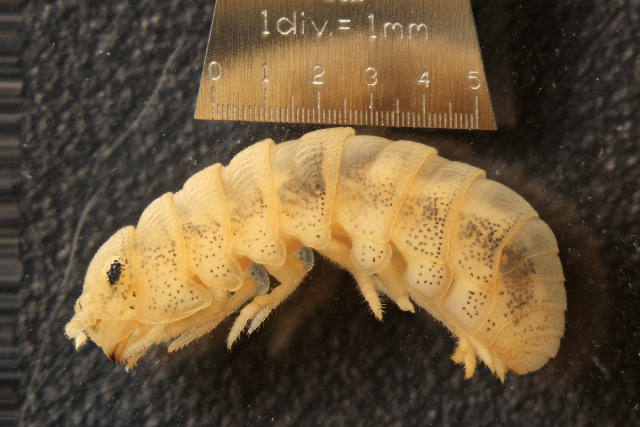

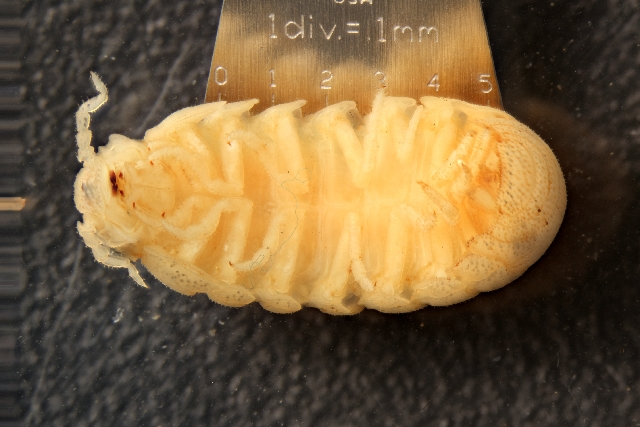

== Subspecies ==
These two subspecies belong to the species Tylos punctatus:

- Tylos punctatus insularis Van Name, 1936
- Tylos punctatus punctatus Holmes & Gay, 1909
