= Dexamine =

Scientific classification
- Kingdom: Animalia
- Phylum: Arthropoda
- Clade: Pancrustacea
- Class: Malacostraca
- Order: Amphipoda
- Family: Dexaminidae
- Subfamily: Dexamininae
- Genus: Dexamine; Leach, 1814

Species
- Dexamine filiola Krapp-Schickel, 2013; Dexamine spiniventris (A. Costa, 1853); Dexamine spinosa (Montagu, 1813); Dexamine thea Boeck, 1861

Synonyms
- Amphithonotus A. Costa in Hope, 1851

Genus of crustaceans

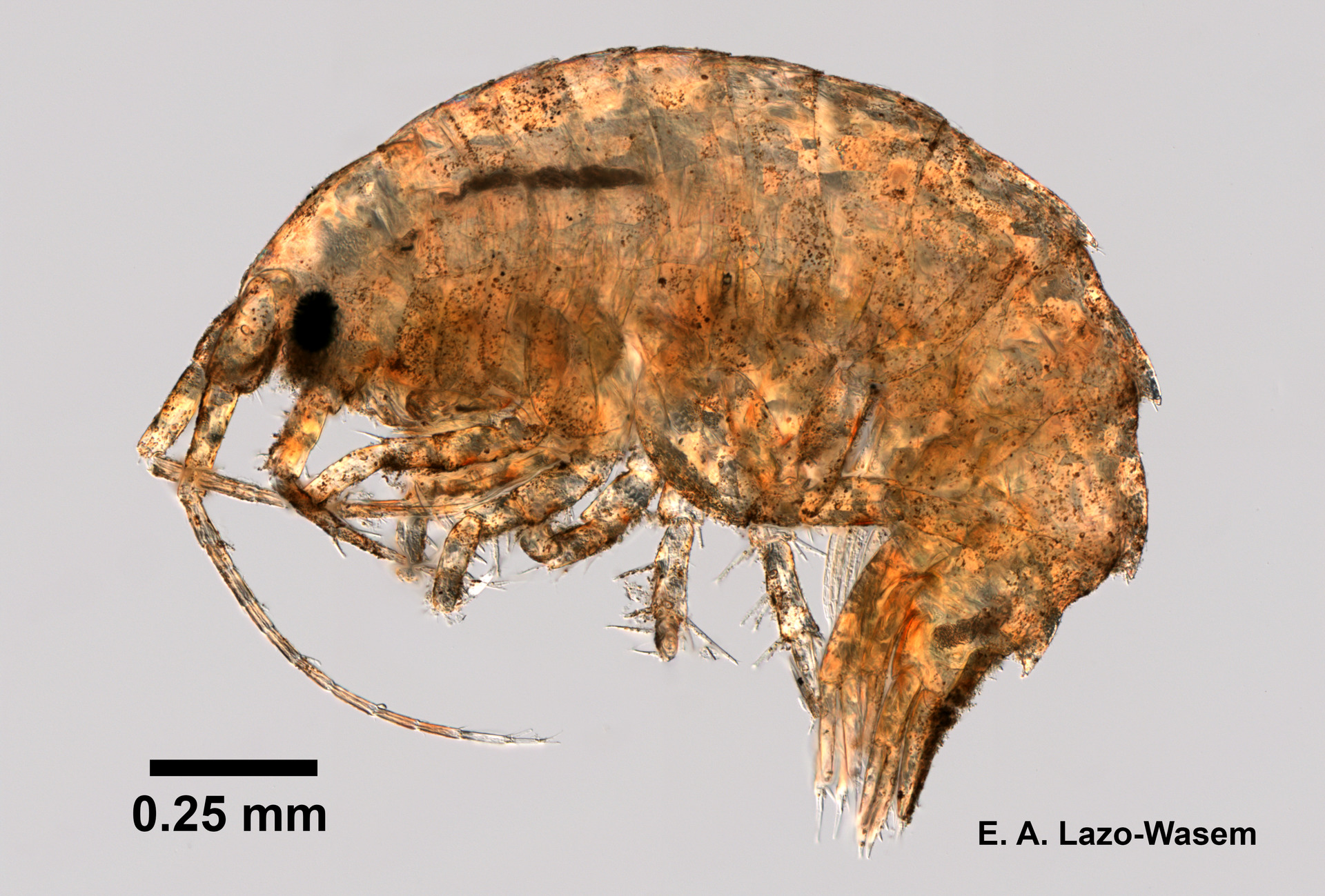
Dexamine thea specimen.

Dexamine is a genus of crustaceans in the family Dexaminidae.
