= Karl von Lützow =

German art historian and critic (1832–1897)

- Born: 25 December 1832; Göttingen, Germany
- Died: 22 April 1897 (aged 64)
- Occupations: German art historian and critic

Karl von Lützow (25 December 1832 – 22 April 1897) was a German art historian and critic.

== Biography ==
He was born in Göttingen. From 1851 to 1856, he studied philology and archæology at the University of Göttingen, where he became member of Burschenschaft Hannovera (fraternity), and the Ludwig-Maximilians-Universität München, where he was a favored student of Friedrich Thiersch. He was associated in Berlin with Wilhelm Lübke in editing Denkmäler der Kunst.

He was appointed docent of art history at the Ludwig-Maximilians-Universität München in 1858, then edited in Vienna the Rezensionen und Mittheilungen über bildende Kunst. In 1864, he became a professor at the Academy of Fine Arts Vienna, where in 1866, he was also made librarian and director of the cabinet of engravings. In 1867, he was appointed professor of architectural history at the Technische Hochschule Wien.

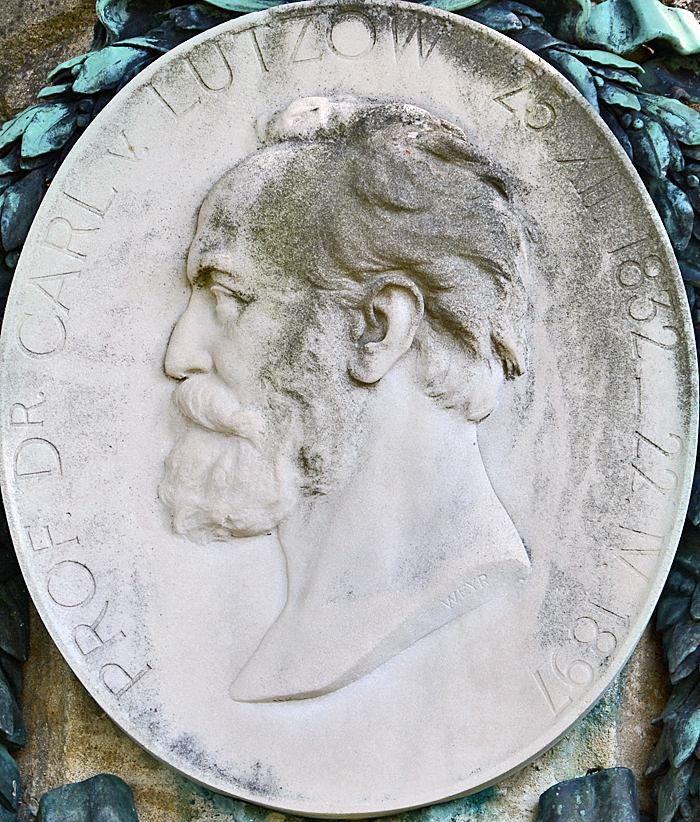
Grave relief of Karl von Lützow at the Zentralfriedhof in Vienna.

== Works ==
His publications include:

- Münchener Antiken (7 vols., 1861–69).
- Die Meisterwerke der Kirchenbaukunst (2nd edition 1871).
- Die Geschichte der kaiserlich-königlichen Akademie der bildenden Künste (1877).
- Die vervielfältigende Kunst der Gegenwart (1886; et seq.).
- Die Kunstschätze Italiens in geographisch-historischer Uebersicht geschildert (second edition, 1900).
- Published in English: Monuments of art, showing its development and progress from the earliest artistic attempts to the present period (with Wilhelm Lübke); translation of Denkmäler der Kunst.
- Geschichte des deutschen Kupferstichs und Holzschnitts (History of German copperplate and wood engraving, 1891).

He founded the Zeitschrift für bildende Kunst (Leipzig, 1866, et seq.), of which he was editor up to the time of his death.
