= Burschenschaft Hannovera =

Student fraternity in Göttingen, Germany

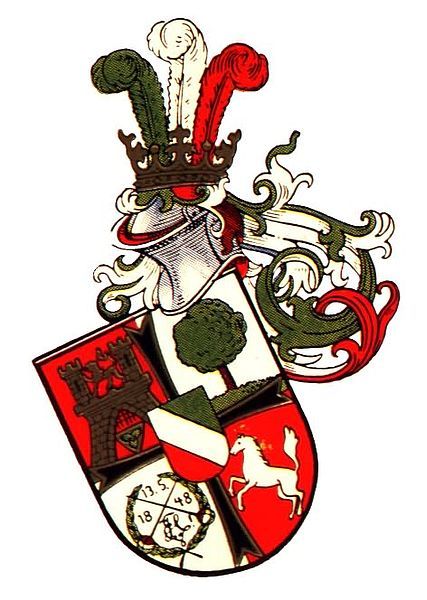
- Founded: May 1848; 178 years ago Georg August University
- Type: Studentenverbindung
- Affiliation: Independent
- Status: Active
- Emphasis: Burschenschaft
- Scope: Local
- Motto: Freiheit durch Einigkeit, 'Freedom through unity'
- Pillars: German Unity, Democracy, Convention Principle, Tolerance, Lifelong Friendship
- Colors: Green, White and Red
- Symbol: Compass
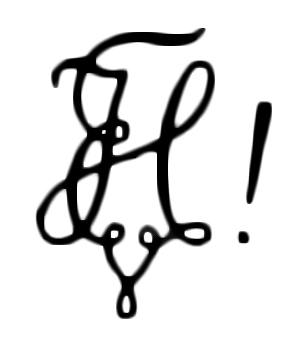
- Zirkel
- Chapters: 1
- Nickname: Grüne Hannoveraner, 'Green Hanoverians' or Die Grünen, 'The Greens'
- Headquarters: Herzberger Landstraße 9 Göttingen, Lower Saxony 37085; Germany
- Website: www.burschenschaft-hannovera.de

Burschenschaft Hannovera is the oldest Burschenschaft, a traditional liberal German Student fraternity or student corporation (Studentenverbindung). It incorporated in Göttingen in 1848 at the Georg August University of Göttingen.Hannovera is a lifelong bond (Lebensbund), which brings together students and alumni of Göttingen University. It is the only one of the classic German fraternities ever to include a woman: opera singer Jenny Lind.

== History ==
Burschenschaft Hannovera formed at the Georg August University of Göttingen in the Revolution year 1848 (May). The founders were graduates of the lyceum in Hanover who were studying at Göttingen.

After almost 100 years of successful growth, Hannovera was forced into dissolution in the Third Reich by order Br.-Nr. II C–1462/39 of the secret state police (Gestapo) Hildesheim, dated April 28, 1939. During World War II, 26 members lost their lives at the front or in captivity. In February 1951, Hannovera was reconstituted as an active covenant by a group of young students and has been active until today.

For more than a hundred years, Hannovera has been part of the green-white-red fraternity cartel formed in 1869 with Germania Jena, Frankonia Heidelberg, and later also Derendingia Tübingen.

== Symbols ==
Hannovera was chosen as its name because the founders were citizens of the Kingdom of Hanover. Hannoveras couleurs are "green-white-red" with a silver lining. All members wear the same ribbon. The cap is green with green-white-red. Following the color of the caps, the members of the fraternity are traditionally called Grüne Hannoveraner, 'Green Hanoverians' or Die Grünen, 'The Greens' Members also wear a tassel and a compass.

In addition to the motto of all old Burschenschaft, Ehre, Freiheit, Vaterland, 'Honor, Freedom, Fatherland' Hannovera bears its own motto, Freiheit durch Einigkeit, 'Freedom through unity'. It follows the democratic tradition of the Urburschenschaft, following common pillars or principles of German unity, democracy, convention principle, tolerance, and lifelong friendship (Lebensbund). It also preserves the principle of facultative academic fencing.

== Club house ==
Since 1908, Hannovera has owned its club house (Grünenhaus), located in Göttingen, Herzberger Landstraße 9. It is now a Listed Building of Special Architectural and Historic Interest. It also houses a small student dormitory and is surrounded by a private garden. The house used to belong to the Protestant theologian Albrecht Ritschl.

== Membership ==
Hannovera is a lifelong bond (Lebensbund), which brings together students and alumni of Göttingen University. It is the only one of the classic German fraternities ever to include a woman: the opera singer Jenny Lind.

== Notable members ==
- August Dresbach (1894–1968), journalist, politician, Member of Parliament (Bundestag)
- Victor von Ebner (1842–1925), anatomist and histologist
- Berend Wilhelm Feddersen (1832–1918), physicist
- Wolfgang Helbig (1839–1915), classical archaeologist
- Lorenz Franz Kielhorn (1840-1908), indologist
- Karl Johann Kiessling (1839–1905), physicist, mathematician, and botanist
- Wilhelm Krause (1833–1910), anatomist
- Carl von Lemcke (1831–1913), aesthetician, art historian, and novelist
- Jenny Lind (1820–1887), opera singer
- Karl von Lützow (1832–1897), art historian and critic
- Alexander Mitscherlich (1836–1918), chemist
- Hans Mühlenfeld (1901–1969), politician, diplomat, ambassador
- Henry Bradford Nason (1831–1895), chemist
- Franz Overbeck (1837–1905), protestant theologian
- Friedrich Stohmann (1832–1897), agricultural chemist
- Max Weber Sr. (1836–1897), lawyer, politician, and Member of the Reichstag of the German Empire
- Hermann Wichelhaus (1842–1927), chemist
- Richard Witting (1856–1923), politician, Member of the Prussian House of Lords, and banker
