= Berend Wilhelm Feddersen =

German physicist

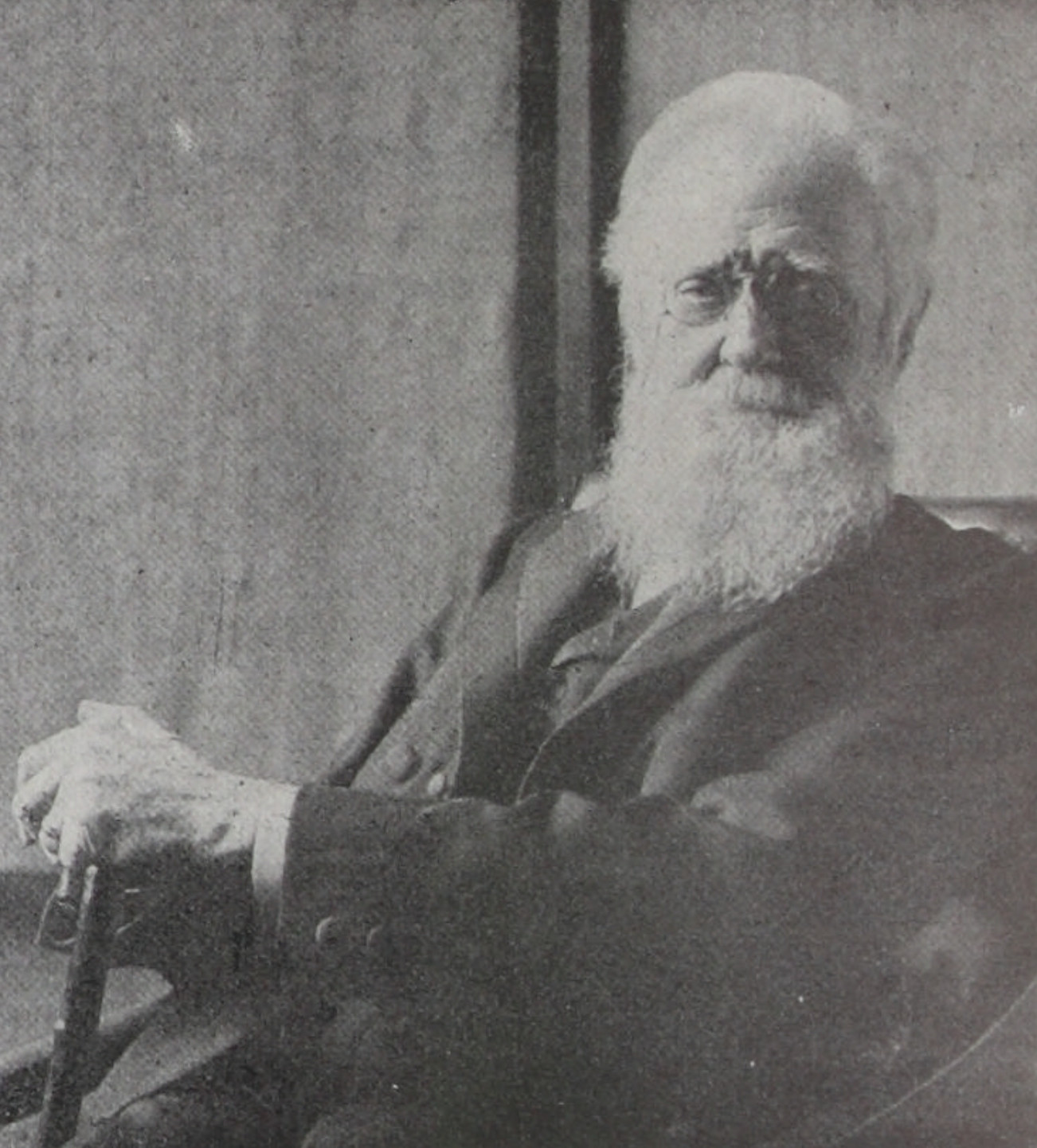
Berend Wilhelm Feddersen

Berend Wilhelm Feddersen (26 March 1832 in Schleswig – 1 July 1918 in Leipzig) was a German physicist.

== Biography ==
Feddersen studied chemistry and physics at the University of Göttingen, where he became member of Burschenschaft Hannovera (fraternity) and lived from 1858 as a private scholar in Leipzig. In 1859 he succeeded in experiments with the Leyden jar to prove that every single electric spark discharge composed of (damped) oscillations. He realized that the arise from a coil, capacitor and resistor existing electrical circuit oscillations. Thus he became the co-founder of wireless technology. Feddersen was co-editor of the Biographical Dictionary and literary and on the history of exact sciences. He was a member of the Saxon Society of Sciences.

== Works ==
- Contributions to the knowledge of the electric spark. Inaugural Dissertation, Kiel 1854th Kiel: CF Mohr, 1857.
- Discharge of the Leyden jar, intermittent, continuous, oscillatory discharge, while the law. Essays ... 1857–1866. / Edited by T. Des Coudres. With a portrait of the author in photogravure and 3 lithographic plates. Leipzig: W. Engelmann, 1908. (Ostwald's Classics of the exact sciences. No 166)
- The discovery of electrical waves. Leipzig 1909th

== See also ==
- Heinrich Hertz
- Invention of radio
- Berend Wilhelm Feddersen, Wikipedia in German de:Berend Wilhelm Feddersen
