= Alexander Mitscherlich (chemist) =

German chemist (1836–1918)

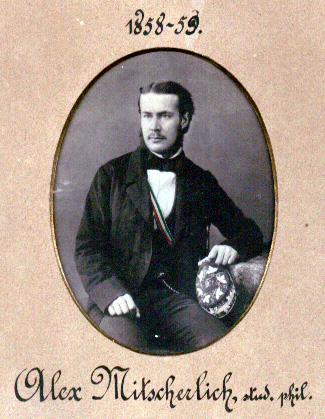
Alexander Mitscherlich in 1858.

Alexander Mitscherlich (28 May 1836 in Berlin – 31 May 1918 in Oberstdorf) was a German chemist and son of Eilhard Mitscherlich.

He studied at University of Göttingen, where he also became member of Burschenschaft Hannovera (fraternity).

His most important work was in the field of processing wood to create cellulose. He patented an early version of the sulfite process in 1882.

In 1909 Mitscherlich wrote on crop yields in agronomy. His results have been characterized as the "sum of two exponential processes."

A historian of plant science wrote in 1942:

A working model of the soil: Liebig's Law of the Minimum was the formulation of an idea that yield of a crop was determined primarily by the amounts of plant food that were present in minimum quantities. His idea was discussed later as the Limiting Factor by BLACKMAN and again by MITSCHERLICH as the Law of Physiological Relations. The latter was expressed as a logarithmic function between yield and the quantity of plant food constituents, which is virtually the Law of Diminishing Returns.
