= Richard Heinze =

German classical philologist (1867–1929)

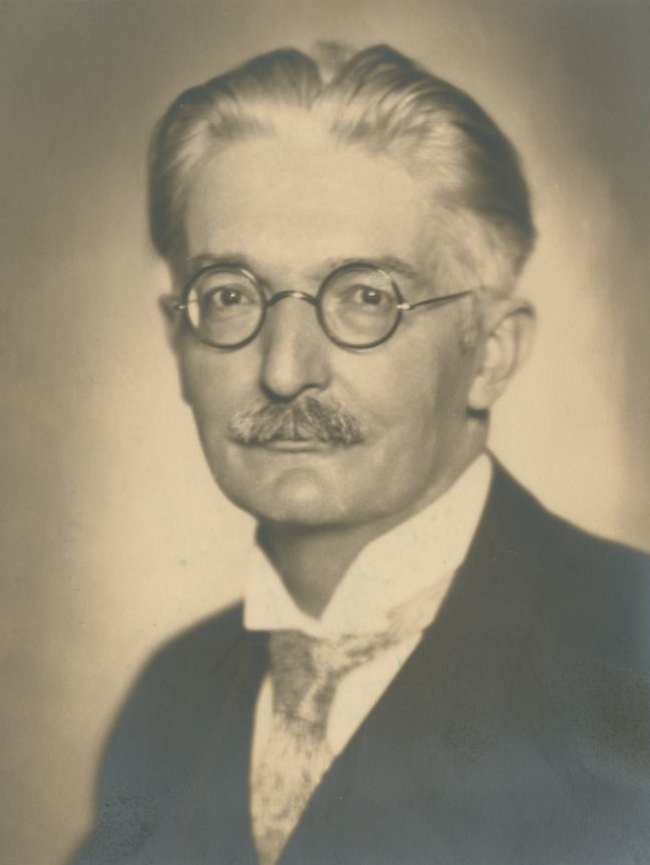
- Born: 11 August 1867; Naumburg, Province of Saxony, Kingdom of Prussia
- Died: 22 August 1929 (aged 62); Bad Wiessee, Free State of Bavaria, Weimar Republic

Academic background
- Education: Leipzig University; University of Bonn; Humboldt University of Berlin; University of Strasbourg
- Thesis: Xenokrates. Darstellung der Lehre und Sammlung der Fragmente (1892)

Academic work
- Institutions: Humboldt University of Berlin; University of Königsberg; Leipzig University
- Notable works: Virgils Epische Technik (1903)

Richard Heinze (11 August 1867 – 22 August 1929) was a German classical philologist. He was a younger brother to politician Rudolf Heinze (1865–1928).

Heinze was born on 11 August 1867 in Naumburg, Province of Saxony, Kingdom of Prussia.

He studied classical philology at the Leipzig University under Otto Ribbeck (1827–1898), later relocating to the University of Bonn (1887), where he had as instructors, Hermann Usener (1834–1905) and Franz Bücheler (1837–1908). Afterwards, he studied in Berlin with Theodor Mommsen (1817–1903), earning his habilitation in 1893 at the University of Strasbourg with a treatise on the philosopher Xenocrates.

In 1900, he became an associate professor in Berlin, and in 1903 became a full professor at the University of Königsberg. From 1906 until his death in 1929, he was a professor at the Leipzig University. In 1923, he succeeded Georg Wissowa (1859–1931) as editor of the magazine Hermes.

Richard Heinze is remembered for his expert analysis of ancient authors that included Ovid, Lucretius and Virgil. His best written effort was the 1903 Virgils Epische Technik, a work that was later translated into English and published as Virgil's Epic Technique.

He died 22 August 1929 in Bad Wiessee.
