= Dexaminidae =

Scientific classification
- Kingdom: Animalia
- Phylum: Arthropoda
- Clade: Pancrustacea
- Class: Malacostraca
- Order: Amphipoda
- Parvorder: Synopiidira
- Superfamily: Dexaminoidea
- Family: Dexaminidae; Leach, 1814

Genera
- See text

Family of crustaceans

Dexaminidae is a family of amphipods. It contains the following genera:

- Delkarlye J. L. Barnard, 1972
- Dexamine Leach, 1814
- Dexaminella Schellenberg, 1928
- Dexaminoculus Lowry, 1981
- Guernea Chevreux, 1887
- Haustoriopsis Schellenberg, 1938
- Neotropis Costa, 1853
- Polycheria Haswell, 1879
- Paradexamine Stebbing, 1899
- Prophlias Nicholls, 1939
- Sebadexius Ledoyer, 1984
- Syndexamine Chilton, 1914
- Tritaeta Boeck, 1876
