= Victor von Ebner =

Austrian anatomist and histologist

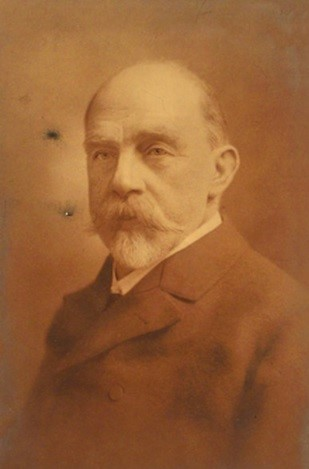
Victor von Ebner

Anton Gilbert Victor von Ebner, Ritter von Rofenstein (February 4, 1842 – March 20, 1925) was an Austrian anatomist and histologist.

== Early life and education ==
Victor von Ebner was a native of Bregenz.

He was a student at the Universities of Göttingen, where he became member of Burschenschaft Hannovera (fraternity), later Vienna (under Ernst Wilhelm von Brücke), and Graz (under Alexander Rollett). In 1866 he earned his doctorate from the University of Vienna.

== Career ==
He was a professor of histology and developmental history at the University of Graz (1873), and a professor of histology at the University of Vienna (1888).

He was editor of Volume III of the sixth edition of Albert von Kölliker's Handbuch der Gewebelehre des Menschen (1899). In addition to his studies involving human anatomy and histology, he was also author of works with zoological and botanical themes.

Because of his descriptions of three anatomical structures, they have been named for him:

- von Ebner's glands (a.k.a. Ebner's glands): a type of serous gland that is found in circumvallate papillae of the tongue
- Ebner's lines: short period incremental lines in the dentin and cementum of the tooth
- Ebner's reticulum: network of nucleated cells in the seminiferous tubules

== Writings ==
- Untersuchungen über den Bau der Samencanälchen und die Entwicklung der Spermatozoiden [Studies on the construction of the seminal tubules, and the development of sperm] (Leipzig, 1871)
- Die acinösen Drüsen der Zunge [The acinus glands of the tongue] (Graz, 1873)
- Über den feineren Bau der Knochensubstanz [On the finer structure of bone] (Sitzungsbericht der kaiserlichen Akademie der Wissenschaften, 1875)
- Mikroskopische Studien über Wachsthum und Wechsel der Haare [Microscopic studies on the growth and changes of hair] (Ib. 1876)
- Untersuchungen über die Ursachen der Anisotropie organisirter Substanzen [Studies on the causes of the anisotropy of organized substances] (Leipzig, 1882)
- Über den feineren Bau der Skelettheile der Kalkschwämme etc. [On the finer structure of the skeletal parts of calcareous sponges] (Sitzungsbericht der kaiserlichen Akademie der Wissenschaften, 1887)
- Histologie der Zähne [Histology of the teeth] in Julius Scheff's Handbuch der Zahnheilkunde (Wien, 1890)
- Über den Bau der Chorda dorsalis der Fische [On the structure of the notochord in fish] (Sitzungsbericht der kaiserlichen Akademie der Wissenschaften, 1895 & 1896)
