= Starred transform =

In applied mathematics, the starred transform, or star transform, is a discrete-time variation of the Laplace transform, so-named because of the asterisk or "star" in the customary notation of the sampled signals. The transform is an operator of a continuous-time function $x(t)$, which is transformed to a function $X^{*}(s)$ in the following manner:

$$\begin{align}
X^{*}(s)=\mathcal{L}[x(t)\cdot \delta_T(t)]=\mathcal{L}[x^{*}(t)],
\end{align}$$

where $\delta_T(t)$ is a Dirac comb function, with period of time T.

The starred transform is a convenient mathematical abstraction that represents the Laplace transform of an impulse sampled function $x^{*}(t)$, which is the output of an ideal sampler, whose input is a continuous function, $x(t)$.

The starred transform is similar to the Z transform, with a simple change of variables, where the starred transform is explicitly declared in terms of the sampling period (T), while the Z transform is performed on a discrete signal and is independent of the sampling period. This makes the starred transform a de-normalized version of the one-sided Z-transform, as it restores the dependence on sampling parameter T.

== Relation to Laplace transform ==
Since $X^{*}(s)=\mathcal{L}[x^{*}(t)]$, where:

$$\begin{align}
x^*(t)\ \stackrel{\mathrm{def}}{=}\ x(t)\cdot \delta_T(t) &= x(t)\cdot \sum_{n=0}^\infty \delta(t-nT).
\end{align}$$

Then per the convolution theorem, the starred transform is equivalent to the complex convolution of $\mathcal{L}[x(t)]=X(s)$ and $\mathcal{L}[\delta_T(t)]=\frac{1}{1-e^{-Ts}}$, hence:

$$X^{*}(s) = \frac{1}{2\pi j} \int_{c-j\infty}^{c+j\infty}{X(p)\cdot \frac{1}{1-e^{-T(s-p)}}\cdot dp}.$$

This line integration is equivalent to integration in the positive sense along a closed contour formed by such a line and an infinite semicircle that encloses the poles of X(s) in the left half-plane of p. The result of such an integration (per the residue theorem) would be:

$$X^{*}(s) = \sum_{\lambda=\text{poles of }X(s)}\operatorname{Res}\limits_{p=\lambda}\bigg[X(p)\frac{1}{1-e^{-T(s-p)}}\bigg].$$

Alternatively, the aforementioned line integration is equivalent to integration in the negative sense along a closed contour formed by such a line and an infinite semicircle that encloses the infinite poles of $\frac{1}{1-e^{-T(s-p)}}$ in the right half-plane of p. The result of such an integration would be:

$$X^{*}(s) = \frac{1}{T}\sum_{k=-\infty}^\infty X\left(s-j\tfrac{2\pi}{T}k\right)+\frac{x(0)}{2}.$$

== Relation to Z transform ==
Given a Z-transform, X(z), the corresponding starred transform is a simple substitution:

$\bigg. X^*(s) = X(z)\bigg|_{\displaystyle z = e^{sT}}$

This substitution restores the dependence on T.

It's interchangeable,

$\bigg. X(z) = X^*(s)\bigg|_{\displaystyle e^{sT} = z}$
$\bigg. X(z) = X^*(s)\bigg|_{\displaystyle s = \frac{\ln(z)}{T}}$

== Properties of the starred transform ==
Property 1: $X^*(s)$ is periodic in $s$ with period $j\tfrac{2\pi}{T}.$

$$X^*(s+j\tfrac{2\pi}{T}k) = X^*(s)$$

Property 2: If $X(s)$ has a pole at $s=s_1$, then $X^{*}(s)$ must have poles at $s=s_1 + j\tfrac{2\pi}{T}k$, where $\scriptstyle k=0,\pm 1,\pm 2,\ldots$
