= Z-plane =

Z-plane may refer to:

- z = e^{sT}, the domain of the z-transform
- z = x + iy, the complex plane in general
