= John R. Ragazzini =

American electrical engineer (1912–1988)

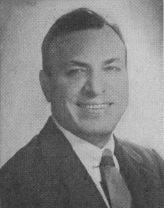
John R. Ragazzini

John Ralph Ragazzini (January 3, 1912 – November 22, 1988) was an American electrical engineer and a professor of Electrical Engineering.

== Biography ==
Ragazzini was born in Manhattan, New York City from Italian immigrants Luigi Ragazzini and Angelina Badelli and received the degrees of B.S. and E.E. at the City College of New York in 1932 and 1933 and earned the degrees of A.M. and Ph.D. in Electrical Engineering at Columbia University in 1939 and 1941.

Ragazzini was dean of the School of Engineering and Science at New York University and during World War II he was chairman of the Department of Electrical Engineering at Columbia University, where he was involved in the Manhattan Project. He also served as a technical aide for the National Defense Research Committee, supervising research in the fields of Ultra high frequency transmitters and receivers, Analog computers and control systems.

Ragazzini's notable students are Rudolf E. Kálmán (known for Kalman filters), Eliahu Ibraham Jury (known for Z-transform), Gene F. Franklin (known for digital control), James H. Mulligan Jr., and Lotfi Asker Zadeh (known for fuzzy sets and fuzzy logic).

Ragazzini joined the faculty of Columbia University in 1941 and led a research group that made important contributions to systems and control. In 1952, he and Lotfi A. Zadeh published "The Analysis of Sampled-Data Systems", an important contribution to the systematic analysis of sampled-data systems. The name "z-transform" originated at Columbia in 1952, where researchers developed and applied mathematical methods for analysing sampled-data systems.

In 1970 he received the Rufus Oldenburger Medal. In 1979, American Automatic Control Council named John R. Ragazzini Award after Ragazzini and he was the first recipient of the award. Ragazzini died on 22 November 1988, aged 76.

== See also ==
- Control theory
- Operational amplifier
