= Final value theorem =

Relation between frequency- and time-domain behavior at large time

In mathematical analysis, the final value theorem (FVT) is one of several similar theorems used to relate frequency domain expressions to the time domain behavior as time approaches infinity. Mathematically, if $f(t)$ in continuous time has (unilateral) Laplace transform $F(s)$, then a final value theorem establishes conditions under which
$$\lim_{t\,\to\,\infty}f(t) = \lim_{s\,\to\, 0}{sF(s)}.$$
Likewise, if $f[k]$ in discrete time has (unilateral) Z-transform $F(z)$, then a final value theorem establishes conditions under which
$$\lim_{k\,\to\,\infty}f[k] = \lim_{z\,\to\, 1}{(z-1)F(z)}.$$

An Abelian final value theorem makes assumptions about the time-domain behavior of $f(t) \text{ (or }f[k])$ to calculate $\lim_{s\,\to\, 0}{sF(s)}.$ Conversely, a Tauberian final value theorem makes assumptions about the frequency-domain behaviour of $F(s)$ to calculate $\lim_{t\to\infty}f(t)$ $\text{(or }\lim_{k\to\infty}f[k])$ (see Abelian and Tauberian theorems for integral transforms).

== Final value theorems for the Laplace transform ==
=== Deducing lim_{t → ∞} f(t) ===
In the following statements, the notation $\text{‘}s \to 0\text{’}$ means that $s$ approaches 0, whereas $\text{‘}s \downarrow 0\text{’}$ means that $s$ approaches 0 through the positive numbers.

==== Standard Final Value Theorem ====
Suppose that every pole of $F(s)$ is either in the open left half plane or at the origin, and that $F(s)$ has at most a single pole at the origin. Then $\lim_{t\to\infty}f(t) = \lim_{s\to 0}sF(s).$

==== Final Value Theorem using Laplace transform of the derivative ====
Suppose that $f(t)$ and $f'(t)$ both have Laplace transforms that exist for all $s > 0.$ If $\lim_{t\to\infty}f(t)$ exists and $\lim_{s\,\to\, 0}{sF(s)}$ exists then $\lim_{t\to\infty}f(t) = \lim_{s\,\to\, 0}{sF(s)}.$

Remark

Both limits must exist for the theorem to hold. For example, if $f(t) = \sin(t)$ then $\lim_{t\to\infty}f(t)$ does not exist, but
$$\lim_{s\,\to\, 0}{sF(s)} = \lim_{s\,\to\, 0}{\frac{s}{s^2+1}} = 0.$$

==== Improved Tauberian converse Final Value Theorem ====
Suppose that $f : (0,\infty) \to \mathbb{C}$ is bounded and differentiable, and that $t f'(t)$ is also bounded on $(0,\infty)$. If $sF(s) \to L \in \mathbb{C}$ as $s \to 0$ then $\lim_{t\to\infty}f(t) = L.$

==== Extended Final Value Theorem ====
Suppose that $F$ is a proper rational function and that every pole of $F$ is either in the open left half-plane or at the origin. Then one of the following occurs:

1. $sF(s) \to L \in \mathbb{R}$ as $s \downarrow 0,$ and $\lim_{t\to\infty}f(t) = L.$
2. $sF(s) \to +\infty \in \mathbb{R}$ as $s \downarrow 0,$ and $f(t) \to +\infty$ as $t \to \infty.$
3. $sF(s) \to -\infty \in \mathbb{R}$ as $s \downarrow 0,$ and $f(t) \to -\infty$ as $t \to \infty.$

In particular, if $s = 0$ is a multiple pole of $F(s)$ then case 2 or 3 applies $(f(t) \to +\infty\text{ or }f(t) \to -\infty).$

==== Generalized Final Value Theorem ====
Suppose that $f(t)$ is Laplace transformable. Let $\lambda > -1$. If $\lim_{t\to\infty}\frac{f(t)}{t^\lambda}$ exists and $\lim_{s\downarrow0}{s^{\lambda+1}F(s)}$ exists then

$$\lim_{t\to\infty}\frac{f(t)}{t^\lambda} = \frac{1}{\Gamma(\lambda+1)} \lim_{s\downarrow0}{s^{\lambda+1}F(s)},$$

where $\Gamma(x)$ denotes the Gamma function.

==== Applications ====
Final value theorems for obtaining $\lim_{t\to\infty}f(t)$ have applications in establishing the long-term stability of a system.

=== Deducing lim_{s → 0} s F(s) ===
==== Abelian Final Value Theorem ====
Suppose that $f : (0,\infty) \to \mathbb{C}$ is bounded and measurable and $\lim_{t\to\infty}f(t) = \alpha \in \mathbb{C}.$ Then $F(s)$ exists for all $s > 0$ and $\lim_{s\,\downarrow\, 0}{sF(s)} = \alpha.$

Elementary proof

Suppose for convenience that $|f(t)|\le1$ on $(0,\infty),$ and let $\alpha=\lim_{t\to\infty}f(t)$. Let $\epsilon>0,$ and choose $A$ so that $|f(t)-\alpha|<\epsilon$ for all $t > A.$ Since
$$s\int_0^\infty e^{-st}\,\mathrm dt=1,$$
for every $s>0$ we have

$$sF(s)-\alpha=s\int_0^\infty(f(t)-\alpha)e^{-st}\,\mathrm dt;$$

hence

$$|sF(s)-\alpha|\le s\int_0^A|f(t)-\alpha|e^{-st}\,\mathrm dt+s\int_A^\infty
|f(t)-\alpha|e^{-st}\,\mathrm dt
\le2s\int_0^Ae^{-st}\,\mathrm dt+\epsilon s\int_A^\infty e^{-st}\,\mathrm dt \equiv I+II.$$

Now for every $s>0$ we have

$$II<\epsilon s\int_0^\infty e^{-st}\,\mathrm dt=\epsilon.$$

On the other hand, since $A<\infty$ is fixed it is clear that $\lim_{s\to 0}I=0$, and so $|sF(s)-\alpha| < \epsilon$ if $s>0$ is small enough.

==== Final Value Theorem using Laplace transform of the derivative ====
Suppose that all of the following conditions are satisfied:

1. $f:(0,\infty) \to \mathbb{C}$ is continuously differentiable and both $f$ and $f'$ have a Laplace transform
2. $f'$ is absolutely integrable - that is, $\int_{0}^{\infty} | f'(\tau) | \, \mathrm d\tau$ is finite
3. $\lim_{t\to\infty} f(t)$ exists and is finite

Then
$$\lim_{s \to 0^{+}} sF(s) = \lim_{t\to\infty} f(t).$$

Remark

The proof uses the dominated convergence theorem.

==== Final Value Theorem for the mean of a function ====
Let $f : (0,\infty) \to \mathbb{C}$ be a continuous and bounded function such that such that the following limit exists

$$\lim_{T\to\infty} \frac{1}{T} \int_{0}^{T} f(t) \, dt = \alpha \in \mathbb{C}$$

Then $\lim_{s\,\to\, 0, \, s>0}{sF(s)} = \alpha.$

==== Final Value Theorem for asymptotic sums of periodic functions ====
Suppose that $f : [0,\infty) \to \mathbb{R}$ is continuous and absolutely integrable in $[0,\infty).$ Suppose further that $f$ is asymptotically equal to a finite sum of periodic functions $f_{\mathrm{as}},$ that is

$$| f(t) - f_{\mathrm{as}}(t) | < \phi(t),$$

where $\phi(t)$ is absolutely integrable in $[0,\infty)$ and vanishes at infinity. Then

$\lim_{s \to 0}sF(s) = \lim_{t \to \infty} \frac{1}{t} \int_{0}^{t} f(x) \, \mathrm dx.$

==== Final Value Theorem for a function that diverges to infinity ====
Let $f(t) : [0,\infty) \to \mathbb{R}$ satisfy all of the following conditions:

1. $f(t)$ is infinitely differentiable at zero
2. $f^{(k)}(t)$ has a Laplace transform for all non-negative integers $k$
3. $f(t)$ diverges to infinity as $t \to \infty$

Let $F(s)$ be the Laplace transform of $f(t)$. Then $sF(s)$ diverges to infinity as $s \downarrow 0.$

==== Final Value Theorem for improperly integrable functions (Abel's theorem for integrals) ====
Let $h : [0,\infty) \to \mathbb{R}$ be measurable and such that the (possibly improper) integral $f(x) := \int_0^x h(t)\,\mathrm dt$ converges for $x\to\infty.$ Then
$$\int_0^\infty h(t)\, \mathrm dt := \lim_{x\to\infty} f(x) = \lim_{s\downarrow 0}\int_0^\infty e^{-st}h(t)\,\mathrm dt.$$
This is a version of Abel's theorem.

To see this, notice that $f'(t) = h(t)$ and apply the final value theorem to $f$ after an integration by parts: For $s > 0,$

$$s\int_0^\infty e^{-st}f(t)\, \mathrm dt = \Big[- e^{-st}f(t)\Big]_{t=o}^\infty + \int_0^\infty e^{-st} f'(t) \, \mathrm dt = \int_0^\infty e^{-st} h(t) \, \mathrm dt.$$

By the final value theorem, the left-hand side converges to $\lim_{x\to\infty} f(x)$ for $s\to 0.$

To establish the convergence of the improper integral $\lim_{x\to\infty}f(x)$ in practice, Dirichlet's test for improper integrals is often helpful. An example is the Dirichlet integral.

==== Applications ====
Final value theorems for obtaining $\lim_{s\,\to\, 0}{sF(s)}$ have applications in probability and statistics to calculate the moments of a random variable. Let $R(x)$ be cumulative distribution function of a continuous random variable $X$ and let $\rho(s)$ be the Laplace–Stieltjes transform of $R(x).$ Then the $n$-th moment of $X$ can be calculated as
$$E[X^n] = (-1)^n\left.\frac{d^n\rho(s)}{ds^n}\right|_{s=0}.$$
The strategy is to write
$$\frac{d^n\rho(s)}{ds^n} = \mathcal{F}\bigl(G_1(s), G_2(s), \dots, G_k(s), \dots\bigr),$$
where $\mathcal{F}(\dots)$ is continuous and for each $k,$ $G_k(s) = sF_k(s)$ for a function $F_k(s).$ For each $k,$ put $f_k(t)$ as the inverse Laplace transform of $F_k(s),$ obtain $\lim_{t\to\infty}f_k(t),$ and apply a final value theorem to deduce $\lim_{s\,\to\, 0}{G_k(s)} =\lim_{s\,\to\, 0}{sF_k(s)} = \lim_{t\to\infty}f_k(t).$ Then

$$\left.\frac{d^n\rho(s)}{ds^n}\right|_{s=0} = \mathcal{F}\Bigl(\lim_{s\,\to\, 0} G_1(s), \lim_{s\,\to\, 0} G_2(s), \dots, \lim_{s\,\to\, 0} G_k(s), \dots\Bigr),$$

and hence $E[X^n]$ is obtained.

=== Examples ===
==== Example where FVT holds ====
For example, for a system described by transfer function

$$H(s) = \frac{ 6 }{s + 2},$$

the impulse response converges to

$$\lim_{t \to \infty} h(t) = \lim_{s \to 0} \frac{6s}{s+2} = 0.$$

That is, the system returns to zero after being disturbed by a short impulse. However, the Laplace transform of the unit step response is

$$G(s) = \frac{1}{s} \frac{6}{s+2}$$

and so the step response converges to

$$\lim_{t \to \infty} g(t) = \lim_{s \to 0} \frac{s}{s} \frac{6}{s+2} = \frac{6}{2} = 3$$

So a zero-state system will follow an exponential rise to a final value of 3.

==== Example where FVT does not hold ====
For a system described by the transfer function

$$H(s) = \frac{9}{s^2 + 9},$$

the final value theorem appears to predict the final value of the impulse response to be 0 and the final value of the step response to be 1. However, neither time-domain limit exists, and so the final value theorem predictions are not valid. In fact, both the impulse response and step response oscillate, and (in this special case) the final value theorem describes the average values around which the responses oscillate.

There are two checks performed in Control theory which confirm valid results for the Final Value Theorem:

1. All non-zero roots of the denominator of $H(s)$ must have negative real parts.
2. $H(s)$ must not have more than one pole at the origin.

Rule 1 was not satisfied in this example, in that the roots of the denominator are $0+j3$ and $0-j3.$

== Final value theorems for the Z transform ==
=== Deducing lim_{k → ∞} f[k] ===
==== Final Value Theorem ====
If $\lim_{k\to\infty}f[k]$ exists and $\lim_{z\,\to\, 1}{(z-1)F(z)}$ exists then $\lim_{k\to\infty}f[k] = \lim_{z\,\to\, 1}{(z-1)F(z)}.$

== Final value of linear systems ==
=== Continuous-time LTI systems ===
Final value of the system

$$\dot{\mathbf{x}}(t) = \mathbf{A} \mathbf{x}(t) + \mathbf{B} \mathbf{u}(t)$$
$$\mathbf{y}(t) = \mathbf{C} \mathbf{x}(t)$$

in response to a step input $\mathbf{u}(t)$ with amplitude $R$ is:

$$\lim_{t\to\infty}\mathbf{y}(t) = -\mathbf{CA}^{-1}\mathbf{B}R$$

=== Sampled-data systems ===
The sampled-data system of the above continuous-time LTI system at the aperiodic sampling times $t_{i}, i=1,2,...$ is the discrete-time system

$${\mathbf{x}}(t_{i+1}) = \mathbf{\Phi}(h_{i}) \mathbf{x}(t_{i}) + \mathbf{\Gamma}(h_{i}) \mathbf{u}(t_{i})$$
$$\mathbf{y}(t_{i}) = \mathbf{C} \mathbf{x}(t_{i})$$

where $h_{i} = t_{i+1}-t_{i}$ and

$\mathbf{\Phi}(h_{i})=e^{\mathbf{A}h_{i}}$, $\mathbf{\Gamma}(h_{i})=\int_0^{h_{i}} e^{\mathbf{A}s} \,\mathrm ds$

The final value of this system in response to a step input $\mathbf{u}(t)$ with amplitude $R$ is the same as the final value of its original continuous-time system.

== See also ==
- Initial value theorem
- Z-transform
- Laplace Transform
- Abelian and Tauberian theorems
