= Dirichlet integral =

Integral of sin(x)/x from 0 to infinity

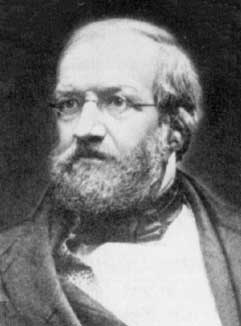
Peter Gustav Lejeune Dirichlet

In mathematics, there are several integrals known as the Dirichlet integral, after the German mathematician Peter Gustav Lejeune Dirichlet, one of which is the improper integral of the sinc function over the positive real number line.

$$\int_0^\infty \frac{\sin x}{x} \,dx = \frac{\pi}{2}.$$

This integral, which is closely related to the alternating harmonic series , is not absolutely convergent, meaning $\left| \frac{\sin x}{x} \right|$ has an infinite Lebesgue or Riemann improper integral over the positive real line, so the sinc function is not Lebesgue integrable over the positive real line. The sinc function is, however, integrable in the sense of the improper Riemann integral or the generalized Riemann or Henstock–Kurzweil integral. This can be seen by using Dirichlet's test for improper integrals.

It is a good illustration of special techniques for evaluating definite integrals, particularly when it is not useful to directly apply the fundamental theorem of calculus due to the lack of an elementary antiderivative for the integrand, as the sine integral, an antiderivative of the sinc function, is not an elementary function. In this case, the improper definite integral can be determined in several ways: the Laplace transform, double integration, differentiating under the integral sign, contour integration, and the Dirichlet kernel. But since the integrand is an even function, the domain of integration can be extended to the negative real number line as well.

== Evaluation ==
=== Laplace transform ===
Let $f(t)$ be a function defined whenever $t \geq 0$. Then its Laplace transform is given by
$$\mathcal{L} \{f(t)\} = F(s) = \int_{0}^{\infty} e^{-st} f(t) \,dt,$$
if the integral exists.

A property of the Laplace transform useful for evaluating improper integrals is
$$\mathcal{L} \left\{  \frac{f(t)}{t} \right\} = \int_{s}^{\infty} F(u) \, du,$$
provided $\lim_{t \to 0} \frac{f(t)}{t}$ exists.

In what follows, one needs the result $\textstyle \mathcal{L}\{\sin t\} = \frac{1}{s^2 + 1}$, which is the Laplace transform of the function $\sin t$ as well as a version of Abel's theorem (a consequence of the final value theorem for the Laplace transform).

Therefore,
$$\begin{align}
\int_{0}^{\infty} \frac{\sin t}{t} \, dt
&= \lim_{s \to 0} \int_{0}^{\infty} e^{-st} \frac{\sin t}{t} \, dt
= \lim_{s \to 0} \mathcal{L} \left\{  \frac{\sin t}{t} \right\} \\[6pt]
&= \lim_{s \to 0} \int_{s}^{\infty} \frac{du}{u^2 + 1}
= \lim_{s \to 0} \arctan u \Biggr|_{s}^{\infty} \\[6pt]
&= \lim_{s \to 0} \left[ \frac{\pi}{2} - \arctan (s)\right]
= \frac{\pi}{2}.
\end{align}$$

=== Double integration ===
Evaluating the Dirichlet integral using the Laplace transform is equivalent to calculating the same double definite integral by changing the order of integration. Namely, for $s > 0$,
$$\begin{align}
\int_0^{\infty} \frac{\sin t}{t} dt &= \int_0^{\infty} \int_0^{\infty} e^{-st} \sin t \, ds \, dt
\\
&= \int_0^{\infty} \int_0^{\infty} e^{-st} \sin t \, dt \, ds
\\
&= \int_{0}^{\infty} \frac{1}{1 + s^2} \, ds
\\
&= \frac{\pi}{2}
\end{align}$$
The change of order is justified by the fact that for all $s > 0$, the integral is absolutely convergent.

=== Differentiation under the integral sign (Feynman's trick) ===
First rewrite the integral as a function of the additional variable $s$, namely, the Laplace transform of $\textstyle \frac{\sin t} t$. So let
$$f(s)=\int_0^\infty e^{-st} \frac{\sin t} t \, dt.$$

In order to evaluate the Dirichlet integral, we need to determine $f(0)$. The continuity of $f$ can be justified by applying the dominated convergence theorem after integration by parts. Differentiate with respect to $s>0$ and apply the Leibniz rule for differentiating under the integral sign to obtain
$$\begin{align}
\frac{df}{ds} & = \frac{d}{ds}\int_0^\infty e^{-st} \frac{\sin t}{t} \, dt = \int_0^\infty \frac{\partial}{\partial s}e^{-st}\frac{\sin t} t \, dt \\[6pt]
& = -\int_0^\infty e^{-st} \sin t \, dt.
\end{align}$$

Now, using Euler's formula $e^{it} = \cos t + i\sin t$, one can express the sine function in terms of complex exponentials:
$$\sin t = \frac{1}{2i} \left( e^{i t} - e^{-it}\right).$$

Therefore,
$$\begin{align}
\frac{df}{ds} & = -\int_0^\infty e^{-st} \sin t \, dt = -\int_{0}^{\infty} e^{-st} \frac{e^{it} - e^{-it}}{2i} dt \\[6pt]
&= -\frac{1}{2i} \int_{0}^{\infty} \left[ e^{-t(s-i)} - e^{-t(s + i)} \right] dt \\[6pt]
&= -\frac{1}{2i} \left [ \frac{-1}{s - i} e^{-t (s - i)} - \frac{-1}{s + i} e^{-t (s + i)}\right]_0^{\infty} \\[6pt]
&= -\frac{1}{2i} \left[ 0 - \left( \frac{-1}{s - i} + \frac{1}{s + i} \right) \right] = -\frac{1}{2i} \left( \frac{1}{s - i} - \frac{1}{s + i} \right) \\[6pt]
&= -\frac{1}{2i} \left( \frac{s + i - (s -i)}{s^2 + 1} \right) = -\frac{1}{s^2 + 1}.
\end{align}$$

Integrating with respect to $s$ gives
$$f(s) = \int \frac{-ds}{s^2 + 1} = A - \arctan s,$$

where $A$ is a constant of integration to be determined. Since $\lim_{s \to \infty} f(s) = 0$, $\textstyle A = \lim_{s \to \infty} \arctan s = \frac{\pi}{2}$, using the principal value. This means that for $s > 0$
$$f(s) = \frac{\pi}{2} - \arctan s.$$

Finally, by continuity at $s = 0$, we have $\textstyle f(0) = \frac{\pi}{2} - \arctan(0) = \frac{\pi}{2}$, as before.

=== Complex contour integration ===
Consider
$$f(z) = \frac{e^{iz}} z.$$

As a function of the complex variable $z$, it has a simple pole at the origin, which prevents the application of Jordan's lemma, whose other hypotheses are satisfied.

Define then a new function
$$g(z) = \frac{e^{iz}}{z + i\varepsilon}.$$

The pole has been moved to the negative imaginary axis, so $g(z)$ can be integrated along the semicircle $\gamma$ of radius $R$ centered at $z = 0$ extending in the positive imaginary direction, and closed along the real axis. One then takes the limit $\varepsilon \to 0$.

The complex integral is zero by the residue theorem, as there are no poles inside the integration path $\gamma$:
$$0 = \int_\gamma g(z) \,dz = \int_{-R}^R \frac{e^{ix}}{x + i\varepsilon} \, dx + \int_0^\pi \frac{e^{i(Re^{i\theta} + \theta)}}{Re^{i\theta} + i\varepsilon} iR \, d\theta.$$

The second term vanishes as $R$ goes to infinity. As for the first integral, one can use one version of the Sokhotski–Plemelj theorem for integrals over the real line: for a complex-valued function f defined and continuously differentiable on the real line and real constants $a$ and $b$ with $a < 0 < b$ one finds
$$\lim_{\varepsilon \to 0^+} \int_a^b \frac{f(x)}{x \pm i \varepsilon} \,dx = \mp i \pi f(0) + \mathcal{P} \int_a^b \frac{f(x)}{x} \,dx,$$

where $\mathcal{P}$ denotes the Cauchy principal value. Back to the above original calculation, one can write
$$0 = \mathcal{P} \int \frac{e^{ix}}{x} \, dx - \pi i.$$

By taking the imaginary part on both sides and noting that the function $\frac{\sin x}{x}$ is even, we get
$$\int_{-\infty}^{+\infty} \frac{\sin(x)}{x} \,dx = 2 \int_0^{+\infty} \frac{\sin(x)}{x} \,dx.$$

Finally,
$$\lim_{\varepsilon \to 0} \int_\varepsilon^\infty \frac{\sin(x)}{x} \, dx = \int_0^\infty \frac{\sin(x)}{x} \, dx = \frac \pi 2.$$

Alternatively, choose as the integration contour for $f$ the union of upper half-plane semicircles of radii $\varepsilon$ and $R$ together with two segments of the real line that connect them. On one hand the contour integral is zero, independently of $\varepsilon$ and $R$; on the other hand, as $\varepsilon \to 0$ and $R \to \infty$ the integral's imaginary part converges to $2 I + \Im\big(\ln 0 - \ln(\pi i)\big) = 2I - \pi$ (here $\ln z$ is any branch of logarithm on upper half-plane), leading to $\textstyle I = \frac{\pi}{2}$.

=== Dirichlet kernel ===
Consider the well-known formula for the Dirichlet kernel:
$$D_n(x) = 1 + 2\sum_{k=1}^n \cos(2kx) = \frac{\sin[(2n+1)x]}{\sin(x)}.$$

It immediately follows that:
$$\int_0^{\frac{\pi}{2}} D_n(x)\, dx = \frac{\pi}{2}.$$

Define
$$f(x) =
\begin{cases}
\frac{1}{x} - \frac{1}{\sin(x)} & x \neq 0 \\[6pt]
0 & x = 0
\end{cases}$$

Clearly, $f$ is continuous when $x \in (0,\pi/2]$; to see its continuity at $0$ apply L'Hopital's Rule:
$$\lim_{x\to 0} \frac{\sin(x) - x}{x\sin(x)} =
\lim_{x\to 0} \frac{\cos(x) - 1}{\sin(x) + x\cos(x)} =
\lim_{x\to 0} \frac{-\sin(x)}{2\cos(x) - x\sin(x)} = 0.$$

Hence, $f$ fulfills the requirements of the Riemann-Lebesgue Lemma. This means:
$$\lim_{\lambda \to \infty} \int_0^{\pi/2} f(x)\sin(\lambda x)dx = 0
\quad\Longrightarrow\quad
\lim_{\lambda \to \infty} \int_0^{\pi/2} \frac{\sin(\lambda x)}{x}dx =
\lim_{\lambda \to \infty} \int_0^{\pi/2} \frac{\sin(\lambda x)}{\sin(x)}dx.$$

We would like to compute:
$$\begin{align}
\int_0^\infty \frac{\sin(t)}{t}dt
= & \lim_{\lambda \to \infty} \int_0^{\lambda\frac{\pi}{2}} \frac{\sin(t)}{t}dt \\[6pt]
= & \lim_{\lambda \to \infty} \int_0^{\frac{\pi}{2}} \frac{\sin(\lambda x)}{x}dx \\[6pt]
= & \lim_{\lambda \to \infty} \int_0^{\frac{\pi}{2}} \frac{\sin(\lambda x)}{\sin(x)}dx \\[6pt]
= & \lim_{n\to \infty} \int_0^{\frac{\pi}{2}} \frac{\sin((2n+1)x)}{\sin(x)}dx \\[6pt]
= & \lim_{n\to \infty} \int_0^{\frac{\pi}{2}} D_n(x) dx = \frac{\pi}{2}
\end{align}$$

However, we must justify switching the real limit in $\lambda$ to the integral limit in $n$, which will follow from showing that the limit does exist.

Using integration by parts, we have:
$$\int_a^b \frac{\sin(x)}{x}dx =
\int_a^b \frac{d(1-\cos(x))}{x}dx =
\left. \frac{1-\cos(x)}{x}\right|_a^b + \int_a^b \frac{1-\cos(x)}{x^2}dx$$

Now, as $a \to 0$ and $b \to \infty$ the term on the left converges with no problem. See the list of limits of trigonometric functions. We now show that $\int_{-\infty}^{\infty} \frac{1-\cos(x)}{x^2}dx$ is absolutely integrable, which implies that the limit exists.

First, we seek to bound the integral near the origin. Using the Taylor-series expansion of the cosine about zero,
$$1 - \cos(x) = 1 - \sum_{k\geq 0}\frac{{(-1)^{(k+1)}}x^{2k}}{(2k)!} = \sum_{k\geq 1}\frac{{(-1)^{(k+1)}}x^{2k}}{(2k)!}.$$

Therefore,
$$\left|\frac{1 - \cos(x)}{x^2}\right|
=  \left|-\sum_{k\geq 0}\frac{x^{2k}}{2(k+1)!}\right|
\leq \sum_{k\geq 0} \frac{|x|^k}{k!}
=  e^{|x|}.$$

Splitting the integral into pieces, we have
$$\int_{-\infty}^{\infty}\left|\frac{1-\cos(x)}{x^2}\right|dx
\leq \int_{-\infty}^{-\varepsilon} \frac{2}{x^2}dx +
\int_{-\varepsilon}^{\varepsilon} e^{|x|}dx +
\int_{\varepsilon}^{\infty} \frac{2}{x^2}dx
\leq K,$$

for some constant $K > 0$. This shows that the integral is absolutely integrable, which implies the original integral exists, and switching from $\lambda$ to $n$ was in fact justified, and the proof is complete.

== See also ==
- Dirichlet distribution
- Dirichlet principle
- Sinc function
- Fresnel integral
