= Eliahu I. Jury =

Iraqi-born American engineer (1923–2020)

Eliahu Ibrahim Jury
- Born: May 23, 1923; Baghdad, Iraq
- Died: September 20, 2020 (aged 97); Miami, Florida, U.S.
- Citizenship: United States
- Education: Technion, Harvard University, Columbia University
- Awards: Rufus Oldenburger Medal (1986); Richard E. Bellman Control Heritage Award (1993)
- Scientific career
- Fields: Control theory
- Doctoral advisor: John Ralph Ragazzini

Eliahu Ibrahim Jury (May 23, 1923 – September 20, 2020) was an Iraqi-born American engineer. He received his the E.E. degree from the Technion – Israel Institute of Technology, Haifa, Mandatory Palestine (now, Israel), in 1947, the M.S. degree in electrical engineering from Harvard University, Cambridge, MA, in 1949, and the Sc.D. degree from Columbia University of New York City in 1953. He was professor of electrical engineering at the University of California, Berkeley, and the University of Miami.

He developed the advanced Z-transform, used in digital control systems and signal processing. He was the creator of the Jury stability criterion, which is named after him.

He was a Life Fellow of the IEEE and received the Rufus Oldenburger Medal from the ASME, the First Education Award of IEEE Circuits and Systems Society, and the IEEE Millennium Medal. In 1993, he received the AACC's Richard E. Bellman Control Heritage Award.

== Bibliography ==
- Theory and Application of the z-Transform Method, John Wiley and Sons, 1964.
- Inners and stability of dynamic systems, John Wiley & Sons, 1974
