= Advanced z-transform =

In mathematics and signal processing, the advanced z-transform is an extension of the z-transform, to incorporate ideal delays that are not multiples of the sampling time. The advanced z-transform is widely applied, for example, to accurately model processing delays in digital control. It is also known as the modified z-transform.

It takes the form

$$F(z, m) = \sum_{k=0}^{\infty} f(k T + m)z^{-k}$$

where

- T is the sampling period
- m (the "delay parameter") is a fraction of the sampling period $[0, T].$

== Properties ==
If the delay parameter, m, is considered fixed then all the properties of the z-transform hold for the advanced z-transform.

=== Linearity ===
$$\mathcal{Z} \left\{ \sum_{k=1}^{n} c_k f_k(t) \right\} = \sum_{k=1}^{n} c_k F_k(z, m).$$

=== Time shift ===
$$\mathcal{Z} \left\{ u(t - n T)f(t - n T) \right\} = z^{-n} F(z, m).$$

=== Damping ===
$$\mathcal{Z} \left\{ f(t) e^{-a\, t} \right\} = e^{-a\, m} F(e^{a\, T} z, m).$$

=== Time multiplication ===
$$\mathcal{Z} \left\{ t^y f(t) \right\} = \left(-T z \frac{d}{dz} + m \right)^y F(z, m).$$

=== Final value theorem ===
$$\lim_{k \to \infty} f(k T + m) = \lim_{z \to 1} (1-z^{-1})F(z, m).$$

== Example ==
Consider the following example where $f(t) = \cos(\omega t)$:

$$\begin{align}
F(z, m) & = \mathcal{Z} \left\{ \cos \left(\omega \left(k T + m \right) \right) \right\} \\
& = \mathcal{Z} \left\{ \cos (\omega k T) \cos (\omega m) - \sin (\omega k T) \sin (\omega m) \right\} \\
& = \cos(\omega m) \mathcal{Z} \left\{ \cos (\omega k T) \right\} - \sin (\omega m) \mathcal{Z} \left\{ \sin (\omega k T) \right\} \\
& = \cos(\omega m) \frac{z \left(z - \cos (\omega T) \right)}{z^2 - 2z \cos(\omega T) + 1} - \sin(\omega m) \frac{z \sin(\omega T)}{z^2 - 2z \cos(\omega T) + 1} \\
& = \frac{z^2 \cos(\omega m) - z \cos(\omega(T - m))}{z^2 - 2z \cos(\omega T) + 1}.
\end{align}$$

If $m=0$ then $F(z, m)$ reduces to the transform

$$F(z, 0) = \frac{z^2 - z \cos(\omega T)}{z^2 - 2z \cos(\omega T) + 1},$$

which is clearly just the z-transform of $f(t)$.
