= Initial value theorem =

Mathematical theorem using Laplace transform

In mathematical analysis, the initial value theorem is a theorem used to relate frequency domain expressions to the time domain behavior as time approaches zero.

Let

$$F(s) = \int_0^\infty f(t) e^{-st}\,dt$$

be the (one-sided) Laplace transform of ƒ(t). If $f$ is bounded on $(0,\infty)$ (or if just $f(t)=O(e^{ct})$) and $\lim_{t\to 0^+}f(t)$ exists then the initial value theorem says

$$\lim_{t\,\to\, 0}f(t)=\lim_{s\to\infty}{sF(s)}.$$

== Proofs ==
=== Proof using dominated convergence theorem and assuming that function is bounded ===
Suppose first that $f$ is bounded, i.e. $\lim_{t\to 0^+}f(t)=\alpha$. A change of variable in the integral $\int_0^\infty f(t)e^{-st}\,dt$ shows that

$$sF(s)=\int_0^\infty f\left(\frac ts\right)e^{-t}\,dt$$.

Since $f$ is bounded, the Dominated Convergence Theorem implies that

$$\lim_{s\to\infty}sF(s)=\int_0^\infty\alpha e^{-t}\,dt=\alpha.$$

=== Proof using elementary calculus and assuming that function is bounded ===
Of course we don't really need DCT here, one can give a very simple proof using only elementary calculus:

Start by choosing $A$ so that $\int_A^\infty e^{-t}\,dt<\epsilon$, and then note that $\lim_{s\to\infty}f\left(\frac ts\right)=\alpha$ uniformly for $t\in(0,A]$.

=== Generalizing to non-bounded functions that have exponential order ===
The theorem assuming just that $f(t)=O(e^{ct})$ follows from the theorem for bounded $f$:

Define $g(t)=e^{-ct}f(t)$. Then $g$ is bounded, so we've shown that $g(0^+)=\lim_{s\to\infty}sG(s)$. But $f(0^+)=g(0^+)$ and $G(s)=F(s+c)$, so

$$\lim_{s\to\infty}sF(s)=\lim_{s\to\infty}(s-c)F(s)=\lim_{s\to\infty}sF(s+c)
=\lim_{s\to\infty}sG(s),$$

since $\lim_{s\to\infty}F(s)=0$.

== See also ==
- Final value theorem
