= Audio crossover =

Electronic filter circuitry used in loudspeakers

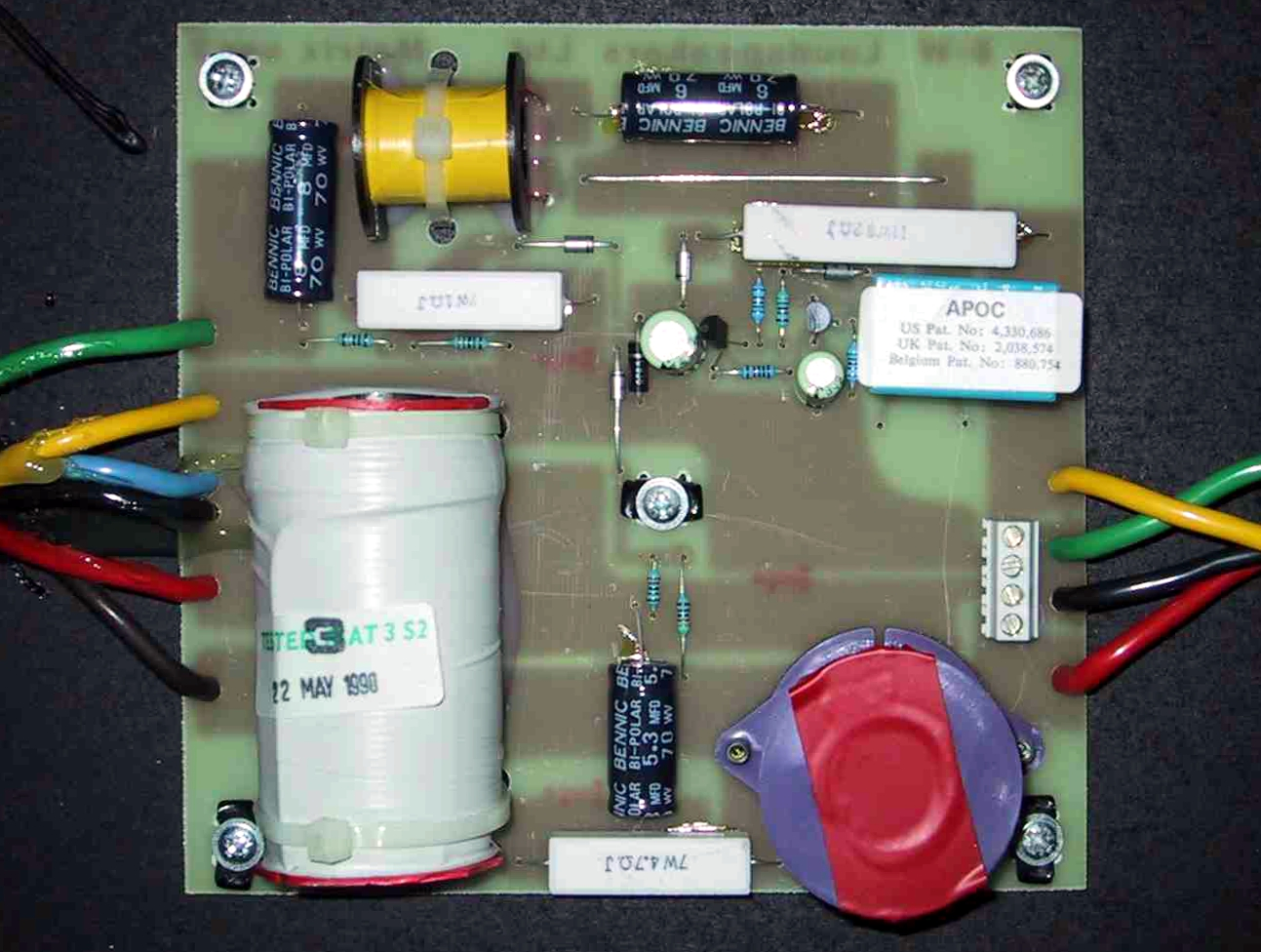
A passive 2-way crossover designed to operate at loudspeaker voltages

Audio crossovers are a type of electronic filter circuitry that splits an audio signal into two or more frequency ranges, so that the signals can be sent to loudspeaker drivers that are designed to operate within different frequency ranges. The crossover filters can be either active or passive. They are often described as two-way or three-way, which indicate, respectively, that the crossover splits a given signal into two frequency ranges or three frequency ranges. Crossovers are used in loudspeaker cabinets, power amplifiers in consumer electronics (such as Hi-Fi, home cinema sound and car audio), and pro audio and musical instrument amplifier products. For the latter two markets, crossovers are used in bass amplifiers, keyboard amplifiers, bass and keyboard speaker enclosures and sound reinforcement system equipment (PA speakers, monitor speakers, subwoofer systems, etc.).

Crossovers are used because most individual loudspeaker drivers are incapable of covering the entire audio spectrum from low frequencies to high frequencies with acceptable relative volume and absence of distortion. Most hi-fi speaker systems and sound reinforcement system speaker cabinets use a combination of multiple loudspeaker drivers, each catering to a different frequency band. A standard simple example is in hi-fi and PA system cabinets that contain a woofer for low and mid frequencies and a tweeter for high frequencies. Since a sound signal source, be it recorded music from a CD player or a live band's mix from an audio console, has all of the low, mid and high frequencies combined, a crossover circuit is used to split the audio signal into separate frequency bands that can be separately routed to loudspeakers, tweeters or horns optimized for those frequency bands.

Passive crossovers are probably the most common type of audio crossover. They use a network of passive electrical components (e.g., capacitors, inductors and resistors) to split up an amplified signal coming from one power amplifier so that it can be sent to two or more loudspeaker drivers (e.g., a woofer and a very low frequency subwoofer, or a woofer and a tweeter, or a woofer-midrange-tweeter combination).

Active crossovers are distinguished from passive crossovers in that they split up an audio signal prior to the power amplification stage so that it can be sent to two or more power amplifiers, each of which is connected to a separate loudspeaker driver. Home cinema 5.1 surround sound audio systems use a crossover that separates out the very-low frequency signal, so that it can be sent to a subwoofer, and then sending the remaining low-, mid- and high-range frequencies to five speakers which are placed around the listener. In a typical application, the signals sent to the surround speaker cabinets are further split up using a passive crossover into a low/mid-range woofer and a high-range tweeter. Active crossovers come in both digital and analog varieties.

Digital active crossovers often include additional signal processing, such as limiting, delay, and equalization. Signal crossovers allow the audio signal to be split into bands that are processed separately before they are mixed together again. Some examples are multiband compression, limiting, de-essing, multiband distortion, bass enhancement, high frequency exciters, and noise reduction such as Dolby A noise reduction.

== Overview ==
Comparison of the magnitude response of 2 pole Butterworth and Linkwitz-Riley crossover filters. The summed output of the Butterworth filters has a +3dB peak at the crossover frequency.

The definition of an ideal audio crossover changes relative to the task and audio application at hand. If the separate bands are to be mixed back together again (as in multiband processing), then the ideal audio crossover would split the incoming audio signal into separate bands that do not overlap or interact and which result in an output signal unchanged in frequency, relative levels, and phase response. This ideal performance can only be approximated. How to implement the best approximation is a matter of lively debate. On the other hand, if the audio crossover separates the audio bands in a loudspeaker, there is no requirement for mathematically ideal characteristics within the crossover itself, as the frequency and phase response of the loudspeaker drivers within their mountings will eclipse the results. Satisfactory output of the complete system comprising the audio crossover and the loudspeaker drivers in their enclosure(s) is the design goal. Such a goal is often achieved using non-ideal, asymmetric crossover filter characteristics.

Many different crossover types are used in audio, but they generally belong to one of the following classes.

== Classification ==
=== Classification based on the number of filter sections ===
Loudspeakers are often classified as "N-way", where N is the number of drivers in the system. For instance, a loudspeaker with a woofer and a tweeter is a 2-way loudspeaker system. An N-way loudspeaker usually has an N-way crossover to divide the signal among the drivers. A 2-way crossover consists of a low-pass and a high-pass filter. A 3-way crossover is constructed as a combination of low-pass, band-pass and high-pass filters (LPF, BPF and HPF respectively). The BPF section is in turn a combination of HPF and LPF sections. 4 (or more) way crossovers are not very common in speaker design, primarily due to the complexity involved, which is not generally justified by better acoustic performance.

An extra HPF section may be present in an "N-way" loudspeaker crossover to protect the lowest-frequency driver from frequencies lower than it can safely handle. Such a crossover would then have a bandpass filter for the lowest-frequency driver. Similarly, the highest-frequency driver may have a protective LPF section to prevent high-frequency damage, though this is far less common.

Recently, a number of manufacturers have begun using what is often called "N.5-way" crossover techniques for stereo loudspeaker crossovers. This usually indicates the addition of a second woofer that plays the same bass range as the main woofer but rolls off far before the main woofer does.

Remark: Filter sections mentioned here is not to be confused with the individual 2-pole filter sections that a higher-order filter consists of.

=== Classification based on components ===
Crossovers can also be classified based on the type of components used.

==== Passive ====
A passive crossover circuit is often mounted in a speaker enclosure to split up the amplified signal into a lower-frequency signal range and a higher-frequency signal range.

A passive crossover splits up an audio signal after it is amplified by a single power amplifier, so that the amplified signal can be sent to two or more driver types, each of which cover different frequency ranges. These crossover are made entirely of passive components and circuitry; the term "passive" means that no additional power source is needed for the circuitry. A passive crossover just needs to be connected by wiring to the power amplifier signal. Passive crossovers are usually arranged in a Cauer topology to achieve a Butterworth filter effect. Passive filters use resistors combined with reactive components such as capacitors and inductors. Very high-performance passive crossovers are likely to be more expensive than active crossovers since individual components capable of good performance at the high currents and voltages at which speaker systems are driven are hard to make.

Inexpensive consumer electronics products, such as budget-priced Home theater in a box packages and low-cost boom boxes, may use lower quality passive crossovers, often utilizing lower-order filter networks with fewer components. Expensive hi-fi speaker systems and receivers may use higher quality passive crossovers, to obtain improved sound quality and lower distortion. The same price/quality approach is often used with sound reinforcement system equipment and musical instrument amplifiers and speaker cabinets; a low-priced stage monitor, PA speaker or bass amplifier speaker cabinet will typically use lower quality, lower priced passive crossovers, whereas high-priced, high-quality cabinets typically will use better quality crossovers. Passive crossovers may use polypropylene, metalized polyester foil, or electrolytic capacitors. Inductors may have air cores, powdered metal cores, ferrite cores, or laminated silicon steel cores, and most are wound with enameled copper wire.

Some passive networks include devices such as fuses, PTC devices, bulbs or circuit breakers to protect the loudspeaker drivers from accidental overpowering (e.g., from sudden surges or spikes). Modern passive crossovers increasingly incorporate equalization networks (e.g., Zobel networks) that compensate for the changes in impedance with frequency inherent in virtually all loudspeakers. The issue is complex, as part of the change in impedance is due to acoustic loading changes across a driver's passband.

Two disadvantages of passive networks are that they may be bulky and cause power loss. They are not only frequency specific, but also impedance specific (i.e. their response varies with the electrical load that they are connected to). This prevents their interchangeability with speaker systems of different impedances. Ideal crossover filters, including impedance compensation and equalization networks, can be very difficult to design, as the components interact in complex ways. Crossover design expert Siegfried Linkwitz said of them that "the only excuse for passive crossovers is their low cost. Their behavior changes with the signal level-dependent dynamics of the drivers. They block the power amplifier from taking maximum control over the voice coil motion. They are a waste of time, if accuracy of reproduction is the goal." Alternatively, passive components can be utilized to construct filter circuits before the amplifier. This implementation is called a passive line-level crossover.

==== Active ====
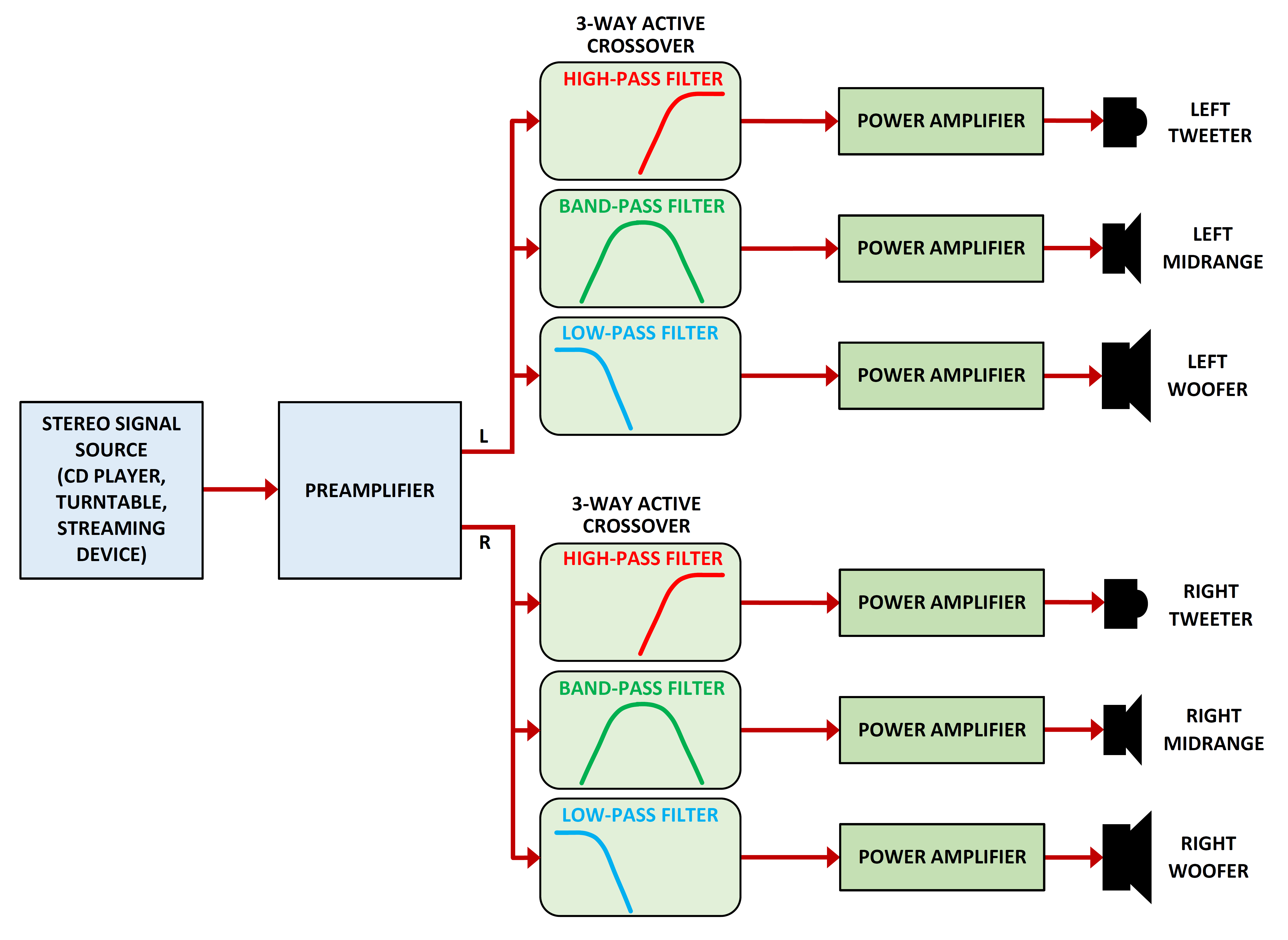
Implementation schematic of a three-way active crossover network for use with a stereo three-way loudspeaker system

An active crossover contains active components in its filters, such as transistors and operational amplifiers. In recent years, the most commonly used active device is an operational amplifier. In contrast to passive crossovers, which operate after the power amplifier's output at high current and in some cases high voltage, active crossovers are operated at levels that are suited to power amplifier inputs. On the other hand, all circuits with gain introduce noise, and such noise has a deleterious effect when introduced prior to the signal being amplified by the power amplifiers.

Active crossovers always require the use of power amplifiers for each output band. Thus a 2-way active crossover needs two amplifiers—one for the woofer and one for the tweeter. This means that a loudspeaker system that is based on active crossovers will often cost more than a passive-crossover-based system. Despite the cost and complication disadvantages, active crossovers provide the following advantages over passive ones:

Typical usage of an active crossover, though a passive crossover can be positioned similarly before the amplifiers

- a frequency response independent of the dynamic changes in a driver's electrical characteristics (e.g. from heating of the voice coil)
- typically, the possibility of an easy way to vary or fine-tune each frequency band to the specific drivers used. Examples would be crossover slope, filter type (e.g., Bessel, Butterworth, Linkwitz-Riley, etc.), relative levels, etc.
- better isolation of each driver from the signals being handled by other drivers, thus reducing intermodulation distortion and overdriving
- the power amplifiers are directly connected to the speaker drivers, thereby maximizing amplifier damping control of the speaker voice coil, reducing consequences of dynamic changes in driver electrical characteristics, all of which are likely to improve the transient response of the system
- reduction in power amplifier output requirement. With no energy being lost in passive components, amplifier requirements are reduced considerably (up to 1/2 in some cases), reducing costs, and potentially increasing quality.

==== Digital ====
Active crossovers can be implemented digitally using a digital signal processor or other microprocessor. They either use digital approximations to traditional analog circuits, known as IIR filters (Bessel, Butterworth, Linkwitz-Riley etc.), or they use Finite Impulse Response (FIR) filters. IIR filters have many similarities with analog filters and are relatively undemanding of CPU resources; FIR filters on the other hand usually have a higher order and therefore require more resources for similar characteristics. They can be designed and built so that they have a linear phase response, which is thought desirable by many involved in sound reproduction. There are drawbacks though—in order to achieve linear phase response, a longer delay time is incurred than would be necessary with an IIR or minimum phase FIR filters. IIR filters, which are by nature recursive, have the drawback that, if not carefully designed, they may enter limit cycles, resulting in non-linear distortion.

==== Mechanical ====
This crossover type is mechanical and uses the properties of the materials in a driver diaphragm to achieve the necessary filtering. Such crossovers are commonly found in full-range speakers which are designed to cover as much of the audio band as possible. By coupling the cone of the speaker to the voice coil bobbin through a compliant section, which serves as a filter, and directly attaching a small, lightweight whizzer cone to the bobbin, the main cone is not vibrated at higher frequencies. The whizzer cone responds to all frequencies, but due to its smaller size, it only gives a useful output at higher frequencies, thereby implementing a mechanical crossover function. Careful selection of materials used for the cone, whizzer and suspension elements determines the crossover frequency and the effectiveness of the crossover. Such mechanical crossovers are complex to design, especially if high fidelity is desired. Computer-aided design has largely replaced the laborious trial and error approach that was historically used. Over several years, the compliance of the materials may change, negatively affecting the frequency response of the speaker.

A more common approach is to employ the dust cap as a high-frequency radiator. The dust cap radiates low frequencies, moving as part of the main assembly, but due to low mass and reduced damping, radiates increased energy at higher frequencies. As with whizzer cones, careful selection of material, shape and position are required to provide smooth, extended output. High frequency dispersion is somewhat different for this approach than for whizzer cones. A related approach is to shape the main cone with such profile, and of such materials, that the neck area remains more rigid, radiating all frequencies, while the outer areas of the cone are selectively decoupled, radiating only at lower frequencies. Cone profiles and materials can be modeled using finite element analysis software and the results are predicted to excellent tolerances.

Speakers which use these mechanical crossovers have some advantages in sound quality despite the difficulties of designing and manufacturing them and despite the inevitable output limitations. Full-range drivers have a single acoustic center and can have relatively modest phase change across the audio spectrum. For best performance at low frequencies, these drivers require careful enclosure design. Their small size (typically 165 to 200 mm) requires considerable cone excursion to reproduce bass effectively. However, the short voice coils, which are necessary for reasonable high-frequency performance, can only move over a limited range. Nevertheless, within these constraints, cost and complications are reduced, as no crossovers are required.

=== Classification based on filter order or slope ===
Just as filters have different orders, so do crossovers, depending on the filter slope they implement. The final acoustic slope may be completely determined by the electrical filter or may be achieved by combining the electrical filter's slope with the natural characteristics of the driver. In the former case, the only requirement is that each driver has a flat response at least to the point where its signal is approximately −10dB down from the passband. In the latter case, the final acoustic slope is usually steeper than that of the electrical filters used. A third- or fourth-order acoustic crossover often has just a second-order electrical filter. This requires that speaker drivers be well behaved a considerable way from the nominal crossover frequency, and further that the high-frequency driver be able to survive a considerable input in a frequency range below its crossover point. This is difficult to achieve in actual practice. In the discussion below, the characteristics of the electrical filter order are discussed, followed by a discussion of crossovers having that acoustic slope and their advantages or disadvantages.

Most audio crossovers use first- to fourth-order electrical filters. Higher orders are not generally implemented in passive crossovers for loudspeakers but are sometimes found in electronic equipment under circumstances for which their considerable cost and complexity can be justified.

==== First order ====
First-order filters have a 20 dB/decade (or 6 dB/octave) slope. All first-order filters have a Butterworth filter characteristic. First-order filters are considered by many audiophiles to be ideal for crossovers. This is because this filter type is 'transient perfect', meaning that the sum of the low-pass and high-pass outputs passes both amplitude and phase unchanged across the range of interest. It also uses the fewest parts and has the lowest insertion loss (if passive). A first-order crossover allows more signal content consisting of unwanted frequencies to get through in the LPF and HPF sections than do higher-order configurations. While woofers can easily handle this (aside from generating distortion at frequencies above those that they can properly reproduce), smaller high-frequency drivers (especially tweeters) are more likely to be damaged, since they are not capable of handling large power inputs at frequencies below their rated crossover point.

In practice, speaker systems with true first-order acoustic slopes are difficult to design because they require large overlapping driver bandwidth, and the shallow slopes mean that non-coincident drivers interfere over a wide frequency range and cause large response shifts off-axis.

==== Second order ====
Second-order filters have a 40 dB/decade (or 12 dB/octave) slope. Second-order filters can have a Bessel, Linkwitz-Riley or Butterworth characteristic depending on design choices and the components that are used. This order is commonly used in passive crossovers as it offers a reasonable balance between complexity, response, and higher-frequency driver protection. When designed with time-aligned physical placement, these crossovers have a symmetrical polar response, as do all even-order crossovers.

It is commonly thought that there will always be a phase difference of 180° between the outputs of a (second-order) low-pass filter and a high-pass filter having the same crossover frequency. And so, in a 2-way system, the high-pass section's output is usually connected to the high-frequency driver 'inverted', to correct for this phase problem. For passive systems, the tweeter is wired with opposite polarity to the woofer; for active crossovers the high-pass filter's output is inverted. In 3-way systems the mid-range driver or filter is inverted. However, this is generally only true when the speakers have a wide response overlap and the acoustic centers are physically aligned.

==== Third order ====
Third-order filters have a 60 dB/decade (or 18 dB/octave) slope. These crossovers usually have Butterworth filter characteristics; phase response is very good, the level sum being flat and in phase quadrature, similar to a first-order crossover. The polar response is asymmetric. In the original D'Appolito MTM arrangement, a symmetrical arrangement of drivers is used to create a symmetrical off-axis response when using third-order crossovers. Third-order acoustic crossovers are often built from first- or second-order filter circuits.

==== Fourth order ====
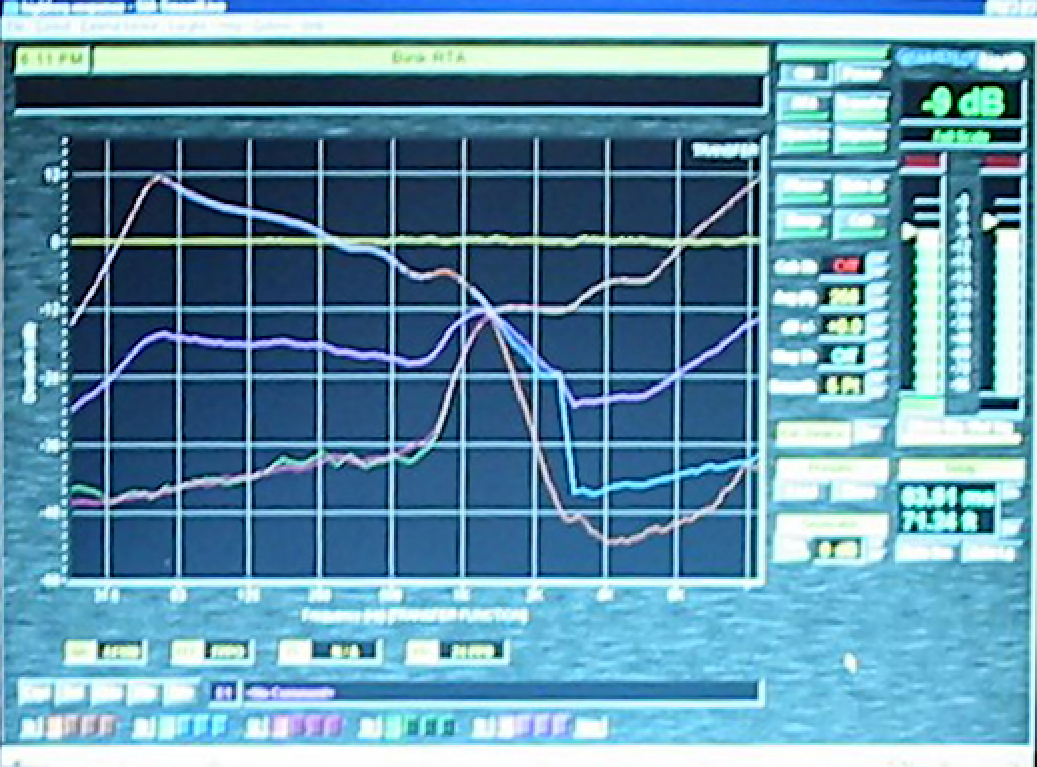
Fourth-order crossover slopes shown on a Smaart transfer function measurement

Fourth-order filters have an 80 dB/decade (or 24 dB/octave) slope. These filters are relatively complex to design in passive form, because the components interact with each other, but modern computer-aided crossover optimisation design software can produce accurate designs. Steep-slope passive networks are less tolerant of parts value deviations or tolerances, and more sensitive to mis-termination with reactive driver loads (although this is also a problem with lower-order crossovers). A 4th-order crossover with −6 dB crossover point and flat summing is also known as a Linkwitz-Riley crossover (named after its inventors), and can be constructed in active form by cascading two 2nd-order Butterworth filter sections. The low-frequency and high-frequency output signals of the Linkwitz–Riley crossover type are in phase, thus avoiding partial phase inversion if the crossover band-passes are electrically summed, as they would be within the output stage of a multiband compressor. Crossovers used in loudspeaker design do not require the filter sections to be in phase; smooth output characteristics are often achieved using non-ideal, asymmetric crossover filter characteristics. Bessel, Butterworth, and Chebyshev are among the possible crossover topologies.

Such steep-slope filters have greater problems with overshoot and ringing but there are several key advantages, even in their passive form, such as the potential for a lower crossover point and increased power handling for tweeters, together with less overlap between drivers, dramatically reducing the shifting of the main lobe of a multi-way loudspeaker system's radiation pattern with frequency, or other unwelcome off-axis effects. With less frequency overlap between adjacent drivers, their geometric location relative to each other becomes less critical and allows more latitude in speaker system cosmetics or (in-car audio) practical installation constraints.

==== Higher order ====
Passive crossovers giving acoustic slopes higher than fourth-order are not common because of cost and complexity. Filters with slopes of up to 96 dB per octave are available in active crossovers and loudspeaker management systems.

==== Mixed order ====
Crossovers can also be constructed with mixed-order filters. For example, a second-order low-pass filter can be combined with a third-order high-pass filter. These are generally passive and are used for several reasons, often when the component values are found by computer program optimization. A higher-order tweeter crossover can sometimes help to compensate for the time offset between the woofer and tweeter, caused by non-aligned acoustic centers.

==== Notched ====
There is a class of crossover filters that produce null responses in the high-pass and low-pass outputs at frequencies close to the crossover frequency. Within their respective stopbands, the outputs have a high initial rate of attenuation, while the sum of their outputs has a flat all-pass response. Their two outputs maintain a constant zero-phase difference across the transition, thus enhancing their lobing performance with noncoincident loudspeaker drivers.

=== Classification based on circuit topology ===
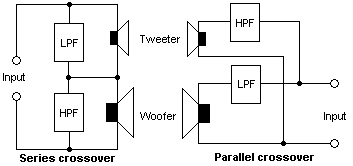
Series and parallel crossover topologies. The HPF and LPF sections for the series crossover are interchanged with respect to the parallel crossover since they appear in shunt with the low- and high-frequency drivers.

==== Parallel ====
Parallel crossovers are by far the most common. Electrically the filters are in parallel and thus the various filter sections do not interact. This makes two-way crossovers easier to design because, in terms of electrical impedance, the sections can be considered separate and because component tolerance variations will be isolated but like all crossovers, the final design relies on the output of the drivers to be complementary acoustically and this, in turn, requires careful matching in amplitude and phase of the underlying crossover. Parallel crossovers also have the advantage of allowing the speaker drivers to be bi-wired, a feature whose benefits are hotly disputed.

==== Series ====
In this topology, the individual filters are connected in series, and a driver or driver combination is connected in parallel with each filter. To understand the signal path in this type of crossover, refer to the "Series Crossover" figure, and consider a high-frequency signal that, during a certain moment, has a positive voltage on the upper Input terminal compared to the lower Input terminal. The low-pass filter presents a high impedance to the signal, and the tweeter presents a low impedance; so the signal passes through the tweeter. The signal continues to the connection point between the woofer and the high-pass filter. There, the HPF presents a low impedance to the signal, so the signal passes through the HPF, and appears at the lower Input terminal. A low-frequency signal with a similar instantaneous voltage characteristic first passes through the LPF, then the woofer, and appears at the lower Input terminal.

==== Derived ====
Derived crossovers include active crossovers in which one of the crossover responses is derived from the other through the use of a differential amplifier. For example, the difference between the input signal and the output of the high-pass section is a low-pass response. Thus, when a differential amplifier is used to extract this difference, its output constitutes the low-pass filter section. The main advantage of derived filters is that they produce no phase difference between the high-pass and low-pass sections at any frequency. The disadvantages are either:

1. that the high-pass and low-pass sections often have different levels of attenuation in their stopbands, i.e., their slopes are asymmetrical, or
2. that the response of one or both sections peaks near the crossover frequency, or both.

In the case of (1), above, the usual situation is that the derived low-pass response attenuates at a much slower rate than the fixed response. This requires the speaker to which it is directed to continue to respond to signals deep into the stopband where its physical characteristics may not be ideal. In the case of (2), above, both speakers are required to operate at higher volume levels as the signal nears the crossover points. This uses more amplifier power and may drive the speaker cones into nonlinearity.

=== Models and simulation ===
Professionals and hobbyists have access to a range of computer tools that were not available before. These computer-based measurement and simulation tools allow for the modeling and virtual design of various parts of a speaker system which greatly accelerate the design process and improve the quality of a speaker. These tools range from commercial to free offerings. Their scope also varies. Some may focus on woofer/cabinet design and issues related to cabinet volume and ports (if any), while others may focus on the crossover and frequency response. Some tools, for instance, only simulate the baffle step response.

In the period before computer modeling made it affordable and quick to simulate the combined effects of drivers, crossovers and cabinets, a number of issues could go unnoticed by the speaker designer. For instance, simplistic three-way crossovers were designed as a pair of two-way crossovers: the tweeter/mid-range and the other the mid-range/woofer sections. This could create excess gain and a 'haystack' response in the mid-range output, together with a lower than anticipated input impedance. Other issues such as improper phase matching or incomplete modeling of the driver impedance curves could also go unnoticed. These problems were not impossible to solve but required more iterations, time and effort than they do today.

== See also ==
- Bass management
- Electrical characteristics of a dynamic loudspeaker
- Full-range speaker
- Loudspeaker enclosure
- Midrange speaker
- Powered speakers
- Subwoofer
- Super tweeter
- Tweeter
- Woofer
