= Filter (signal processing) =

Device for suppressing part of a signal

In signal processing, a filter is a device or process that removes some unwanted components or features from a signal. Filtering is a class of signal processing, the defining feature of filters being the complete or partial suppression of some aspect of the signal. Most often, this means removing some frequencies or frequency bands. However, filters do not exclusively act in the frequency domain; especially in the field of image processing, many other targets for filtering exist. Correlations can be removed for certain frequency components and not for others without having to act in the frequency domain. Filters are widely used in electronics and telecommunication, in radio, television, audio recording, radar, control systems, music synthesis, image processing, computer graphics, and structural dynamics.

There are many different bases of classifying filters and these overlap in many different ways; there is no simple hierarchical classification. Filters may be:

- non-linear or linear
- time-variant or time-invariant, also known as shift invariance. If the filter operates in a spatial domain, then the characterization is space invariance.
- causal or non-causal: A filter is non-causal if its present output depends on future input. Filters processing time-domain signals in real time must be causal, but not filters acting on spatial domain signals or deferred-time processing of time-domain signals.
- analog or digital
- discrete-time (sampled) or continuous-time
- passive or active type of continuous-time filter
- infinite impulse response (IIR) or finite impulse response (FIR) type of discrete-time or digital filter.

== Linear continuous-time filters ==
Linear continuous-time circuit is perhaps the most common meaning for filter in the analog signal processing world, and simply "filter" is often taken to be synonymous. These circuits are generally designed to remove certain frequencies and allow others to pass. Circuits that perform this function are generally linear in their response, or at least approximately so. Any nonlinearity would potentially result in the output signal containing frequency components not present in the input signal.

The modern design methodology for linear continuous-time filters is called network synthesis. Some important filter families designed in this way are:

- Chebyshev filter, the best approximation to the ideal response of any filter for a specified order and ripple.
- Butterworth filter, a maximally flat frequency response in the passband.
- Bessel filter, a maximally flat phase delay in the passband.
- Elliptic filter, the steepest cutoff of any filter for a specified order and ripple.

The difference between these filter families is that they all use a different polynomial function to approximate to the ideal filter response. This results in each having a different transfer function.

Another older, less-used methodology is the image parameter method. Filters designed by this methodology are archaically called "wave filters". Some important filters designed by this method are:

- Constant k filter, the original and simplest form of wave filter.
- m-derived filter, a modification of the constant k filter with improved cutoff steepness and impedance matching.

=== Terminology ===
Some terms used to describe and classify linear filters:

- The frequency response can be classified into a number of different bandforms describing which frequency bands the filter passes (the passband) and which it rejects (the stopband):
  - Low-pass filter, low frequencies are passed, high frequencies are attenuated.
  - High-pass filter, high frequencies are passed, low frequencies are attenuated.
  - Band-pass filter, only frequencies in a frequency band are passed.
  - Band-stop filter or band-reject filter, only frequencies in a frequency band are attenuated.
  - Notch filter, rejects just one specific frequency - an extreme band-stop filter.
  - Comb filter, has multiple regularly spaced narrow passbands, giving the bandform the appearance of a comb.
  - All-pass filter, all frequencies are passed, but the phase of the output is modified.
- Cutoff frequency, the frequency beyond which the filter will not pass signals. It is usually measured at a specific attenuation such as 3 dB.
- Roll-off, the rate at which attenuation increases beyond the cutoff frequency.
- Transition band, the (usually narrow) band of frequencies between a passband and stopband.
- Ripple, the variation of the filter's insertion loss in the passband.
- The order of a filter is the degree of the approximating polynomial and in passive filters corresponds to the number of elements required to build it. Increasing order increases roll-off and brings the filter closer to the ideal response.

One important application of filters is in telecommunication. Many telecommunication systems use frequency-division multiplexing, where the system designers divide a wide frequency band into many narrower frequency bands called "slots" or "channels", and each stream of information is allocated one of those channels. The people who design the filters at each transmitter and each receiver try to balance passing the desired signal through as accurately as possible, keeping interference to and from other cooperating transmitters and noise sources outside the system as low as possible, at reasonable cost.

Multilevel and multiphase digital modulation systems require filters that have flat phase delay—are linear phase in the passband—to preserve pulse integrity in the time domain, giving less intersymbol interference than other kinds of filters.

On the other hand, analog audio systems using analog transmission can tolerate much larger ripples in phase delay, and so designers of such systems often deliberately sacrifice linear phase to get filters that are better in other ways—better stop-band rejection, lower passband amplitude ripple, lower cost, etc.

== Technologies ==
Filters can be built in a number of different technologies. The same transfer function can be realised in several different ways, that is the mathematical properties of the filter are the same but the physical properties are quite different. Often the components in different technologies are directly analogous to each other and fulfill the same role in their respective filters. For instance, the resistors, inductors and capacitors of electronics correspond respectively to dampers, masses and springs in mechanics. Likewise, there are corresponding components in distributed-element filters.

- Electronic filters were originally entirely passive, consisting of resistance, inductance and capacitance. Active technology makes design easier and opens up new possibilities in filter specifications.
- Digital filters operate on signals represented in digital form. The essence of a digital filter is that it directly implements a mathematical algorithm, corresponding to the desired filter transfer function, in its programming or microcode.
- Mechanical filters are built out of mechanical components. In the vast majority of cases, they are used to process an electronic signal and transducers are provided to convert this to and from a mechanical vibration. However, examples do exist of filters that have been designed for operation entirely in the mechanical domain.
- Distributed-element filters are constructed out of components made from small pieces of transmission line or other distributed elements. There are structures in distributed-element filters that directly correspond to the lumped elements of electronic filters, and others that are unique to this class of technology.
- Waveguide filters consist of waveguide components or components inserted in the waveguide. Waveguides are a class of transmission line and many structures of distributed-element filters, for instance the stub, can also be implemented in waveguides.
- Optical filters were originally developed for purposes other than signal processing such as lighting and photography. With the rise of optical fiber technology, however, optical filters increasingly find signal processing applications and signal processing filter terminology, such as longpass and shortpass, is entering the field.
- Transversal filter, or delay line filter, works by summing copies of the input after various time delays. This can be implemented with various technologies including analog delay lines, active circuitry, CCD delay lines, or entirely in the digital domain.

=== Digital filters ===
A general finite impulse response filter with n stages, each with an independent delay, d_{i} and amplification gain, a_{i}.

Digital signal processing allows the inexpensive construction of a wide variety of filters. The signal is sampled and an analog-to-digital converter turns the signal into a stream of numbers. A computer program running on a CPU or a specialized DSP (or less often running on a hardware implementation of the algorithm) calculates an output number stream. This output can be converted to a signal by passing it through a digital-to-analog converter. There are problems with noise introduced by the conversions, but these can be controlled and limited for many useful filters. Due to the sampling involved, the input signal must be of limited frequency content or aliasing will occur.

=== Quartz filters and piezoelectrics ===
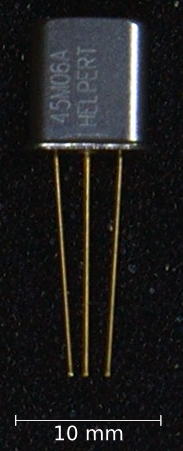
Crystal filter with a center frequency of 45 MHz and a bandwidth B_{3dB} of 12 kHz.

In the late 1930s, engineers realized that small mechanical systems made of rigid materials such as quartz would acoustically resonate at radio frequencies, i.e. from audible frequencies (sound) up to several hundred megahertz. Some early resonators were made of steel, but quartz quickly became favored. The biggest advantage of quartz is that it is piezoelectric. This means that quartz resonators can directly convert their own mechanical motion into electrical signals. Quartz also has a very low coefficient of thermal expansion, which means that quartz resonators can produce stable frequencies over a wide temperature range. Quartz crystal filters have much higher quality factors than LCR filters. When higher stabilities are required, the crystals and their driving circuits may be mounted in a "crystal oven" to control the temperature. For very narrow band filters, sometimes several crystals are operated in series.

A large number of crystals can be collapsed into a single component by mounting comb-shaped evaporations of metal on a quartz crystal. In this scheme, a "tapped delay line" reinforces the desired frequencies as the sound waves flow across the surface of the quartz crystal. The tapped delay line has become a general scheme of making high-Q filters in many different ways.

=== SAW filters ===
SAW (surface acoustic wave) filters are electromechanical devices commonly used in radio frequency applications. Electrical signals are converted to a mechanical wave in a device constructed of a piezoelectric crystal or ceramic; this wave is delayed as it propagates across the device, before being converted back to an electrical signal by further electrodes. The delayed outputs are recombined to produce a direct analog implementation of a finite impulse response filter. This hybrid filtering technique is also found in an analog sampled filter. SAW filters are limited to frequencies up to 3 GHz. The filters were developed by Professor Ted Paige and others.

=== BAW filters ===
BAW (bulk acoustic wave) filters are electromechanical devices. BAW filters can implement ladder or lattice filters. BAW filters typically operate at frequencies from around 2 to around 16 GHz, and may be smaller or thinner than equivalent SAW filters. Two main variants of BAW filters are making their way into devices: thin-film bulk acoustic resonator or FBAR and solid-mounted bulk acoustic resonators (SMRs).

=== Garnet filters ===
Another method of filtering, at microwave frequencies from 800 MHz to about 5 GHz, is to use a synthetic single crystal yttrium iron garnet sphere made of a chemical combination of yttrium and iron (YIGF, or yttrium iron garnet filter). The garnet sits on a strip of metal driven by a transistor, and a small loop antenna touches the top of the sphere. An electromagnet changes the frequency that the garnet will pass. The advantage of this method is that the garnet can be tuned over a very wide frequency by varying the strength of the magnetic field.

=== Atomic filters ===
For even higher frequencies and greater precision, the vibrations of atoms must be used. Atomic clocks use caesium masers as ultra-high Q filters to stabilize their primary oscillators. Another method, used at high, fixed frequencies with very weak radio signals, is to use a ruby maser tapped delay line.

== The transfer function ==
The transfer function of a filter is most often defined in the domain of the complex frequencies. The back-and-forth passage to and from this domain is operated by the Laplace transform and its inverse (therefore, here below, the term "input signal" shall be understood as "the Laplace transform of" the time representation of the input signal, and so on).

The transfer function $H(s)$ of a filter is the ratio of the output signal $Y(s)$ to the input signal $X(s)$ as a function of the complex frequency $s$:

$$H(s)=\frac{Y(s)}{X(s)}$$

with $s = \sigma + j \omega$.

For filters that are constructed of discrete components (lumped elements):

- Their transfer function will be the ratio of polynomials in $s$, i.e. a rational function of $s$. The order of the transfer function will be the highest power of $s$ encountered in either the numerator or the denominator polynomial.
- The polynomials of the transfer function will all have real coefficients. Therefore, the poles and zeroes of the transfer function will either be real or occur in complex-conjugate pairs.
- Since the filters are assumed to be stable, the real part of all poles (i.e. zeroes of the denominator) will be negative, i.e. they will lie in the left half-plane in complex frequency space.

Distributed-element filters do not, in general, have rational-function transfer functions, but can approximate them.

The construction of a transfer function involves the Laplace transform, and therefore it is necessary to assume null initial conditions, because

$$\mathcal{L}\left\{\frac{df}{dt}\right\} = s\cdot\mathcal{L} \left\{ f(t) \right\}-f(0),$$

And when f(0) = 0 we can get rid of the constants and use the usual expression

$$\mathcal{L}\left\{\frac{df}{dt}\right\} = s\cdot\mathcal{L} \left\{ f(t) \right\}$$

An alternative to transfer functions is to give the behavior of the filter as a convolution of the time-domain input with the filter's impulse response. The convolution theorem, which holds for Laplace transforms, guarantees equivalence with transfer functions.

=== Classification ===
Certain filters may be specified by family and bandform. A filter's family is specified by the approximating polynomial used, and each leads to certain characteristics of the transfer function of the filter. Some common filter families and their particular characteristics are:

- Butterworth filter – no gain ripple in passband and stopband, slow cutoff
- Chebyshev filter (Type I) – no gain ripple in stopband, moderate cutoff
- Chebyshev filter (Type II) – no gain ripple in passband, moderate cutoff
- Bessel filter – no group delay ripple, no gain ripple in both bands, slow gain cutoff
- Elliptic filter – gain ripple in pass and stopband, fast cutoff
- Optimum "L" filter
- Gaussian filter – no ripple in response to step function
- Raised-cosine filter

Each family of filters can be specified to a particular order. The higher the order, the more the filter will approach the "ideal" filter; but also the longer the impulse response is and the longer the latency will be. An ideal filter has full transmission in the passband, complete attenuation in the stopband, and an abrupt transition between the two bands, but this filter has infinite order (i.e., the response cannot be expressed as a linear differential equation with a finite sum) and infinite latency (i.e., its compact support in the Fourier transform forces its time response to be everlasting).

Here is an image comparing Butterworth, Chebyshev, and elliptic filters. The filters in this illustration are all fifth-order low-pass filters. The particular implementation – analog or digital, passive or active – makes no difference; their output would be the same. As is clear from the image, elliptic filters are sharper than the others, but they show ripples on the whole bandwidth.

Any family can be used to implement a particular bandform of which frequencies are transmitted, and which, outside the passband, are more or less attenuated. The transfer function completely specifies the behavior of a linear filter, but not the particular technology used to implement it. In other words, there are a number of different ways of achieving a particular transfer function when designing a circuit. A particular bandform of filter can be obtained by transformation of a prototype filter of that family.

== Impedance matching ==
Impedance matching structures invariably take on the form of a filter, that is, a network of non-dissipative elements. For instance, in a passive electronics implementation, it would likely take the form of a ladder topology of inductors and capacitors. The design of matching networks shares much in common with filters and the design invariably will have a filtering action as an incidental consequence. Although the prime purpose of a matching network is not to filter, it is often the case that both functions are combined in the same circuit. The need for impedance matching does not arise while signals are in the digital domain.

Similar comments can be made regarding power dividers and directional couplers. When implemented in a distributed-element format, these devices can take the form of a distributed-element filter. There are four ports to be matched and widening the bandwidth requires filter-like structures to achieve this. The inverse is also true: distributed-element filters can take the form of coupled lines.

== Some filters for specific purposes ==
- Audio filter
- Line filter
- Scaled correlation, high-pass filter for correlations
- Texture filtering

=== Filters for removing noise from data ===
- Wiener filter
- Kalman filter
- Savitzky–Golay smoothing filter

== See also ==
- Electronic filter topology
- Lifter (signal processing)
- Noise reduction
- Sallen–Key topology
- Smoothing
- Multiplier (Fourier analysis)
