= Audio equalization =

Changing the balance of frequency components in an audio signal

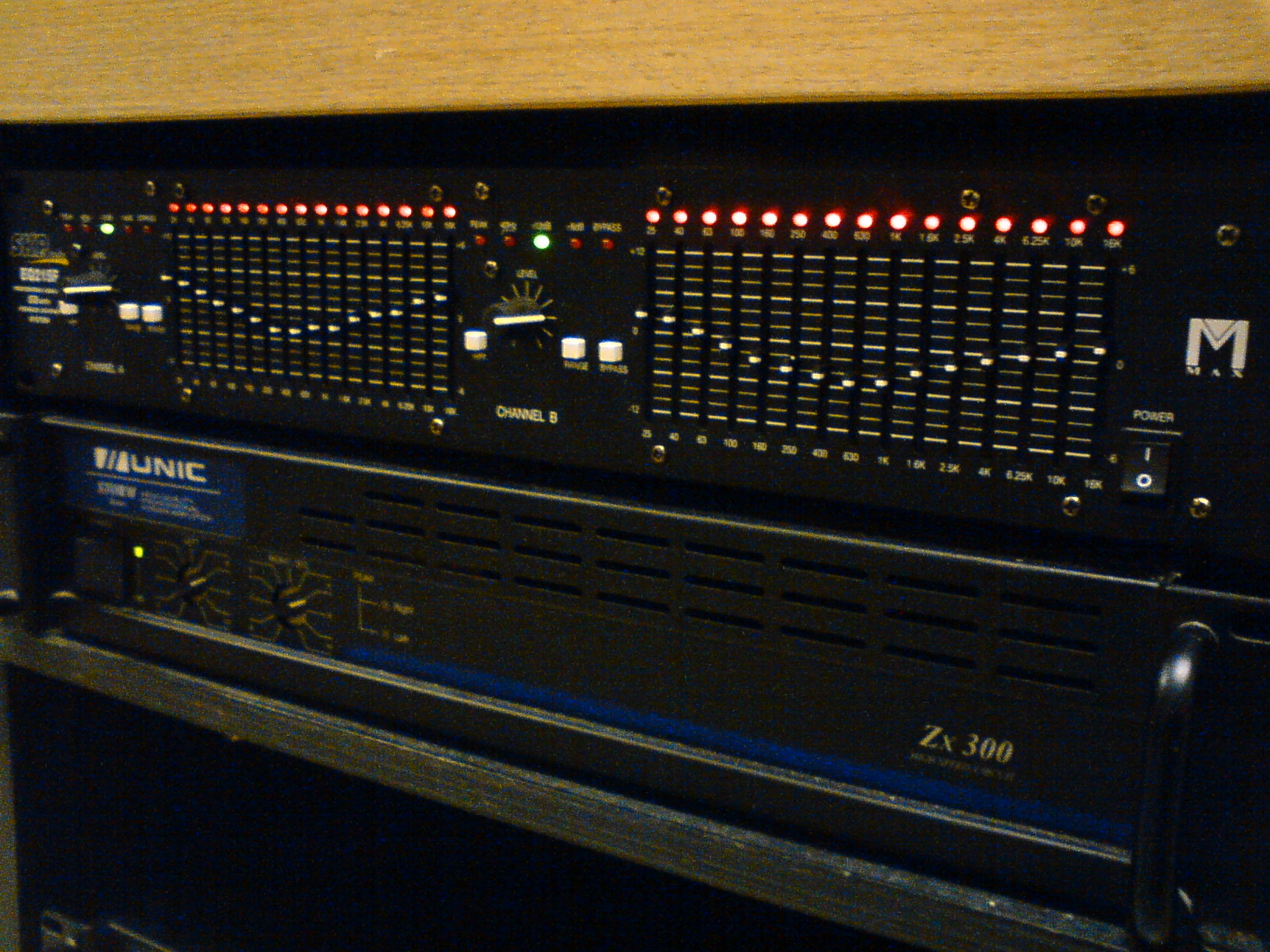
A stereo graphic equalizer. For the left and right bands of the sound content, there are a series of vertical faders, which can be used to boost or cut specific frequency ranges. This equalizer is set to a smiley face curve, in which the mid-range sound frequencies are cut.

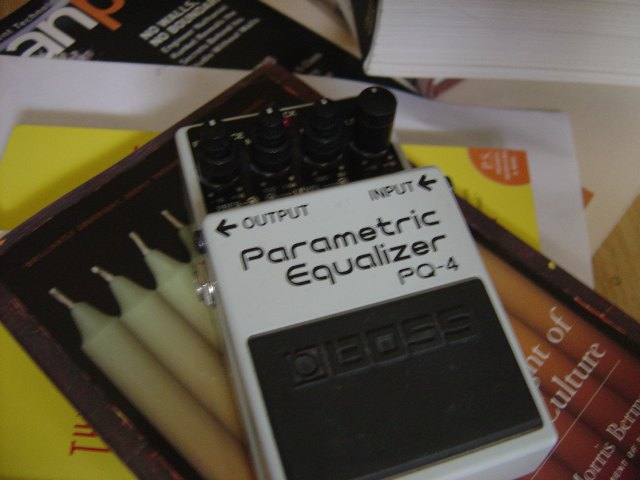
Equalizers are also made in compact pedal-style effect units for use by electric guitarists. This pedal is a parametric equalizer.

Equalization, or simply EQ, in sound recording and reproduction is the process of adjusting the volume of different frequency bands within an audio signal. The circuit or equipment used to achieve this is called an equalizer.

Most hi-fi equipment uses relatively simple filters to make bass and treble adjustments. Graphic and parametric equalizers have much more flexibility in tailoring the frequency content of an audio signal. Broadcast and recording studios use sophisticated equalizers capable of much more detailed adjustments, such as eliminating unwanted sounds or making certain instruments or voices more prominent. Because of this ability, they can be aptly described as "frequency-specific volume knobs."

Equalizers are used in recording and radio studios, production control rooms, and live sound reinforcement and in instrument amplifiers, such as guitar amplifiers, to correct or adjust the response of microphones, instrument pickups, loudspeakers, and hall acoustics. Equalization may also be used to eliminate or reduce unwanted sounds (e.g., low-frequency hum coming from a guitar amplifier), make certain instruments or voices more (or less) prominent, enhance particular aspects of an instrument's tone, or combat feedback (howling) in a public address system. Equalizers are also used in music production to adjust the timbre of individual instruments and voices by adjusting their frequency content and to fit individual instruments within the overall frequency spectrum of the mix.

== Terminology ==
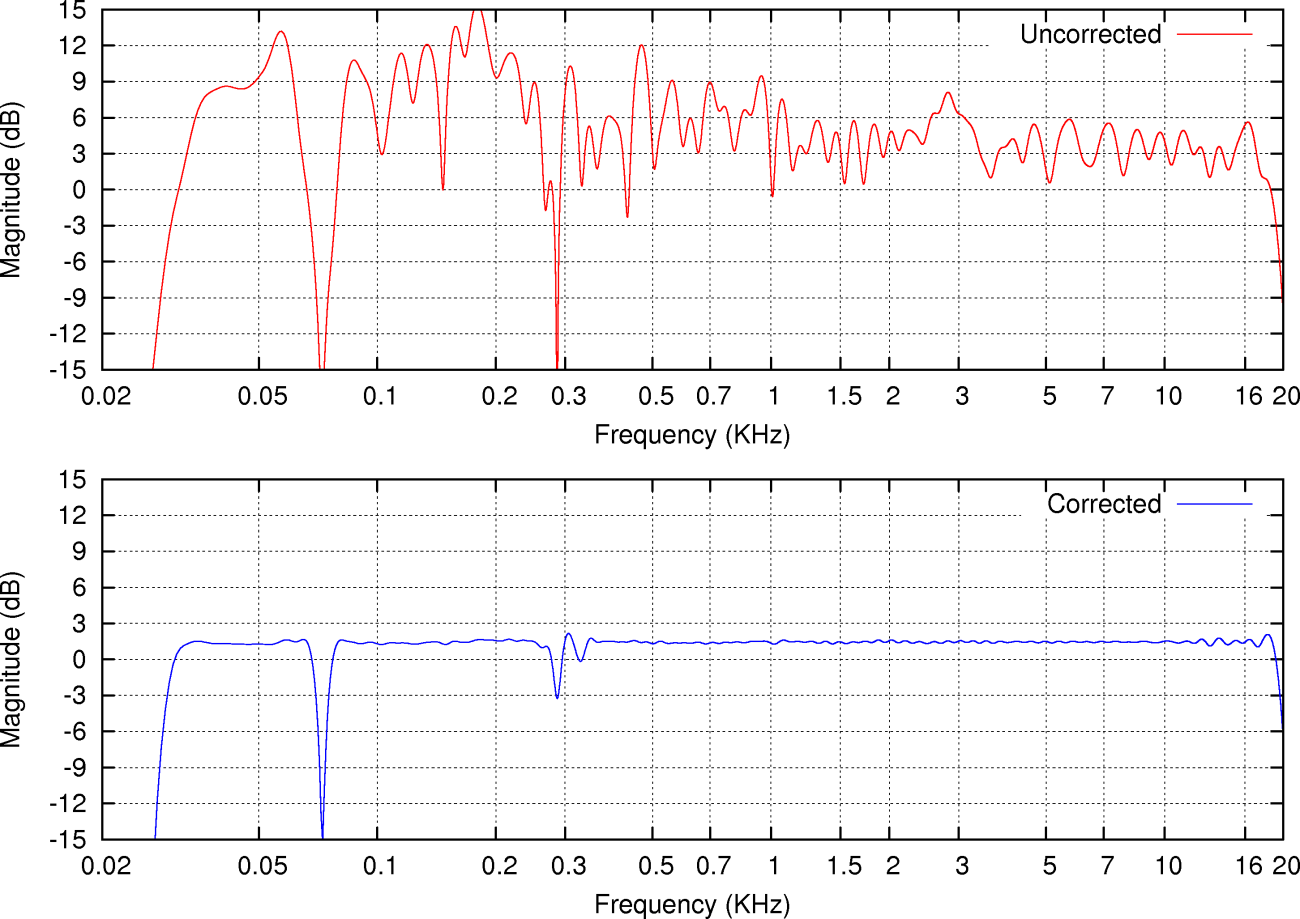
The very uneven spectrum of white noise played through imperfect speakers and modified by room acoustics (top) is equalized using a sophisticated filter using digital hardware (bottom). The resulting flat response fails, however, at 71 Hz where the original system had a null in its response which cannot be corrected.

The concept of equalization was first applied in correcting the frequency response of telephone lines using passive filters; this was prior to the invention of electronic amplification. Initially, equalization was used to compensate for the uneven frequency response of an electric system by applying a filter having the opposite response, thus restoring the fidelity of the transmission. A plot of the system's net frequency response would be a flat line, as its response at any frequency would be equal to its response at any other frequency. Hence the term equalization.

Later, the concept was applied in audio engineering to adjust the frequency response in recording, reproduction, and live sound reinforcement systems. Sound engineers correct the frequency response of a sound system so that the frequency balance of the music as heard through speakers better matches the original performance picked up by a microphone. Audio amplifiers have long had filters or controls to modify their frequency response. These are most often in the form of variable bass and treble controls, and switches to apply low-cut or high-cut filters for elimination of low-frequency rumble and high-frequency hiss respectively.

Graphic equalizers and other equipment developed for improving fidelity have since been used by recording engineers to modify frequency responses for aesthetic reasons. Hence in the field of audio electronics, the term equalization is now broadly used to describe the application of such filters regardless of intent. This broad definition, therefore, includes all linear filters at the disposal of a listener or engineer.

Audio equalization can be based on user-selected audio modes, such as movie, music, night, gaming, dialogue and sports.

A British EQ or British style equalizer is one with similar properties to those on mixing consoles made in the UK by companies such as Amek, Neve and Soundcraft from the 1950s through to the 1970s. Later on, as other manufacturers started to market their products, these British companies began touting their equalizers as being a cut above the rest. Today, many non-British companies such as Behringer and Mackie advertise British EQ on their equipment. A British-style EQ seeks to replicate the qualities of the expensive British mixing consoles.

== History ==
Filtering audio frequencies dates back at least to acoustic telegraphy and multiplexing in general. Audio electronic equipment evolved to incorporate filtering elements as consoles in radio stations began to be used for recording as well as broadcasting. Early filters included basic bass and treble controls featuring fixed frequency centers and fixed levels of cut or boost. These filters worked over broad frequency ranges. Variable equalization in audio reproduction was first used by John Volkman working at RCA in the 1920s. That system was used to equalize a motion picture theater sound playback system.

The Langevin EQ-251-A, designed by Art Davis, was the first equalizer to use slide controls. It featured two passive equalization sections, a bass shelving filter, and a band-pass filter. Each filter had switchable frequencies and used a 15-position slide switch to adjust cut or boost. The passive design required 14 dB of make-up gain. Born in Salt Lake City, Davis worked in Southern California most of his life for a series of companies including Cinema Engineering (from 1938), Langevin, Electrodyne, Cetec and Altec. The first true graphic equalizer was the type 7080, an active tube device developed in the 1950s by Davis's Cinema Engineering company. It featured six bands, each 1.5 octaves wide, with a boost or cut range of 8 dB. It used a slide switch to adjust each band in 1 dB steps. Three summing amps smoothly restored the gain lost in the filter circuits. Davis followed this in 1961 with the Langevin EQ-252-A, having seven sliders, then reworked it for Altec Lansing to create the Model 9062A EQ, which sold well into the 1970s. In 1967 Davis developed the first 1/3 octave variable notch filter set, the Altec-Lansing "Acousta-Voice" system.

In 1966, Burgess Macneal and George Massenburg envisioned a tunable EQ for a new recording console. Bob Meushaw, a friend of Massenburg, built the equalizer. According to Massenburg, "Four people could possibly lay claim to the modern concept: Bob Meushaw, Burgess Macneal, Daniel Flickinger, and myself… Our (Bob's, Burgess' and my) sweep-tunable EQ was borne, more or less, out of an idea that Burgess and I had around 1966 or 1967 for an EQ... three controls adjusting, independently, the parameters for each of three bands for a recording console... I wrote and delivered the AES paper on Parametrics at the Los Angeles show in 1972... It's the first mention of 'Parametric' associated with sweep-tunable EQ."

Daniel N. Flickinger introduced the first parametric equalizer in early 1971. His design leveraged a high-performance op-amp of his own design, the 535 series to achieve filtering circuits that were previously impossible. Flickinger's patent from early in 1971 showed the circuit topology that would come to dominate audio equalization until the present day, as well as the theoretical underpinnings of the elegant circuit. Instead of slide potentiometers working on individual bands of frequency, or rotary switches, Flickinger's circuit allowed arbitrary selection of frequency and cut or boost level in three overlapping bands over the entire audio spectrum. Six knobs on his early EQs would control these sweepable filters. Up to six switches were incorporated to select shelving on the high and low bands, and bypassing for any unused band for the purest signal path.

Similar designs appeared soon thereafter from George Massenburg (in 1972) and Burgess McNeal from ITI Corp. In May 1972 Massenburg used the term parametric equalization in a paper presented at the 42nd convention of the Audio Engineering Society. Most channel equalization on mixing consoles made from 1971 to the present day rely upon the designs of Flickinger, Massenburg and McNeal in either semi or fully-parametric topology. In the late 1990s and in the 2000s, parametric equalizers became increasingly available as digital signal processing (DSP) equipment, usually in the form of plug-ins for various digital audio workstations. Standalone outboard gear versions of DSP parametric equalizers were also quickly introduced after the software versions.

== Filter types ==
Two first-order shelving filters: a −3 dB bass cut (red), and a +9 dB treble boost (blue).

Second-order linear filter functions. Blue: a 9 dB boost at 1 kHz. Red: a 6 dB cut at 100 Hz having a higher Q (narrower bandwidth).

Although the range of equalization functions is governed by the theory of linear filters, the adjustment of those functions and the flexibility with which they can be adjusted varies according to the topology of the circuitry and controls presented to the user.

Shelving controls are usually simple first-order filter functions that alter the relative gains between frequencies much higher and much lower than the cutoff frequencies. A low shelf, such as the bass control on most hi-fi equipment, is adjusted to affect the gain of lower frequencies while having no effect well above its cutoff frequency. A high shelf, such as a treble control, adjusts the gain of higher frequencies only. These are broad adjustments designed more to increase the listener's satisfaction than to provide actual equalization in the strict sense of the term.

A parametric equalizer has one or more sections, each of which implements a second-order filter function. This involves three adjustments: selection of the center frequency (in Hz), adjustment of the Q which determines the sharpness of the bandwidth, and the level or gain control which determines how much those frequencies are boosted or cut relative to frequencies much above or below the center frequency selected. In a semi-parametric equalizer, the bandwidth is preset by the designer. In a quasi-parametric equalizer, the user is given limited switchable options for bandwidth.

A graphic equalizer also implements second-order filter functions in a more user-friendly manner, but with somewhat less flexibility. This equipment is based on a bank of filters covering the audio spectrum in up to 31 frequency bands. Each second-order filter has a fixed center frequency and Q factor, but an adjustable level. The user can raise or lower each slider in order to visually approximate a graph of the intended frequency response.

Equalization in the context of audio reproduction is not used strictly to compensate for the deficiency of equipment and transmission channels. A high-pass filter modifies a signal by eliminating only lower frequencies. An example of this is a low-cut or rumble filter, which is used to remove infrasonic energy from a program that may consume undue amplifier power and cause excessive diaphragm excursions in (or even damage to) loudspeakers. A low-pass filter only modifies the audio signal by removing high frequencies. An example of this is a high-cut or hiss filter, which is used to remove annoying white noise at the expense of the crispness of the program material.

A first-order low-pass or high-pass filter has a standard response curve that reduces the unwanted frequencies well above or below the cutoff frequency with a slope of 6 dB per octave. (Note: A doubling of signal voltage and a consequent quadrupling of signal power for every doubling of frequency.) A second-order filter will reduce those frequencies with a slope of 12 dB per octave and moreover, may be designed with a higher Q or finite zeros in order to effect an even steeper response around the cutoff frequency. For instance, a second-order low-pass notch filter section only reduces (rather than eliminates) very high frequencies, but has a steep response falling to zero at a specific frequency (the so-called notch frequency). Such a filter might be ideal, for instance, in completely removing the 19 kHz FM stereo subcarrier pilot signal while helping to cut even higher frequency subcarrier components remaining from the stereo demultiplexer.

In addition to adjusting the relative amplitude of frequency bands, an audio equalizer usually alters the relative phases of those frequencies. While the human ear is not as sensitive to the phase of audio frequencies, music professionals may favor certain equalizers because of how they affect the timbre of the musical content by way of audible phase artifacts.

=== High-pass and low-pass filters ===
A high-pass filter is a filter, an electronic circuit or device, that passes higher frequencies well but attenuates lower-frequency components. A low-pass filter passes low-frequency components of signals while attenuating higher frequencies. In audio applications, these high-pass and low-pass filters are frequently termed low cut and high cut, respectively, to emphasize their effect on the original signal. For instance, sometimes audio equipment will include a switch labeled high cut or described as a hiss filter (hiss being high-frequency noise). In the phonograph era, many stereos would include a switch to introduce a high-pass (low cut) filter, often called a rumble filter, to eliminate infrasonic frequencies. High and low-pass filters are used in audio crossovers to direct energy to the speaker drivers capable of reproducing it. For instance, a low-pass filter is used in the signal chain before a subwoofer to ensure that only deep bass frequencies reach the subwoofer.

=== Shelving filter ===
While high-pass and low-pass filters are useful for removing unwanted signal above or below a set frequency, shelving filters can be used to reduce or increase signals above or below a set frequency. Shelving filters are used as common tone controls (bass and treble) found in consumer audio equipment such as home stereos, and on guitar amplifiers and bass amplifiers. These implement a first-order response and provide an adjustable boost or cut to frequencies above or below a certain point.

A high shelf or treble control will have a frequency response |H(f)| whose square is given by:

$$|H(f)|^2 = {{1 + (f/f_z)^2} \over {1 + (f/f_p)^2}}$$

where f_{p} and f_{z} are called the pole and zero frequencies, respectively. Turning down the treble control increases f_{z} and decreases f_{p} so that frequencies higher than f_{p} are attenuated. Turning up the treble control increases f_{p} and decreases f_{z} so that frequencies higher than f_{z} are boosted. Setting the treble control at the center sets f_{z} = f_{p} so that |H(f)|^{2} = 1 and the circuit has no effect. At most, the slope of the filter response in the transition region will be 6 dB per octave.

Similarly, the response of a low shelf or bass control can be represented as:

$$|H(f)|^2 =  (f_z/f_p)^2 \; {{1 + (f/f_z)^2} \over {1 + (f/f_p)^2}}.$$

In this case, the inclusion of the leading factor simply indicates that the response at frequencies much higher than f_{z} or f_{p} is unity and that only bass frequencies are affected.

A high shelving control in which f_{z} is set to infinity, or a low shelving response in which f_{z} is set to zero, implements a first-order low-pass or high-pass filter, respectively. However, the usual tone controls have a more limited range, since their purpose is not to eliminate any frequencies but only to achieve a greater balance when, for instance, the treble is lacking and the sound is not crisp. Since the range of possible responses from shelving filters is so limited, some audio engineers considered shelving controls inadequate for equalization tasks. On some bass amps and DI boxes, the units provide both low and high shelving controls and additional equalization controls.

=== Graphic equalizer ===
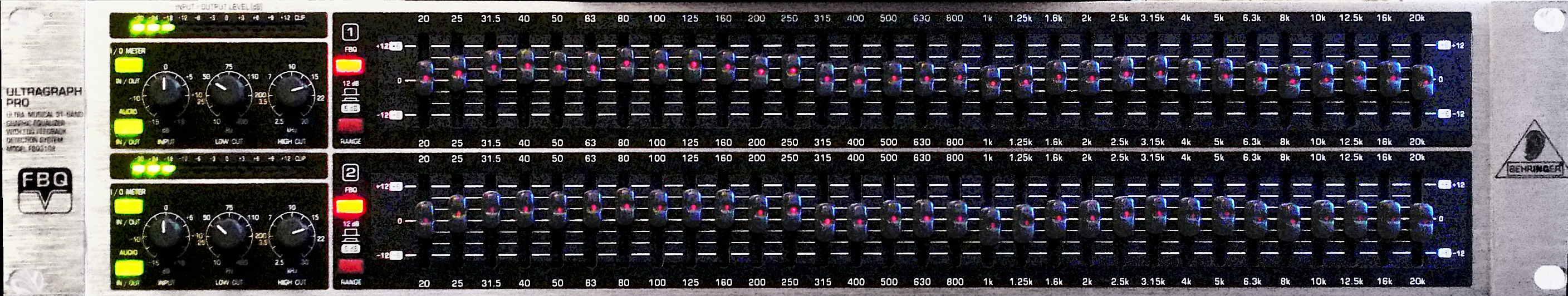
Stereo 31-band 1/3-octave graphic equalizer for use in sound reinforcement applications

In the graphic equalizer, or GEQ for short, the input signal is sent to a bank of filters. Each filter passes the portion of the signal present in its own frequency range or band. The amplitude passed by each filter is adjusted using a slide control to boost or cut frequency components passed by that filter. The vertical position of each slider thus indicates the gain applied to that frequency band, so that the sliders resemble a graph of the equalizer's response plotted versus frequency.

The number of frequency channels may be matched to the requirements of the intended application. A car audio equalizer might have a total of five to ten frequency bands. An equalizer for professional live sound reinforcement typically has some 25 to 31 bands, for more precise control of feedback problems and equalization of room modes. Such an equalizer is called a 1/3-octave equalizer (spoken informally as "third-octave EQ") because the center frequencies of its filters are spaced one third of an octave apart, three filters to an octave. Equalizers with half as many filters per octave are common where less precise control is required—this design is called a 2/3-octave equalizer.

=== Parametric equalizer ===
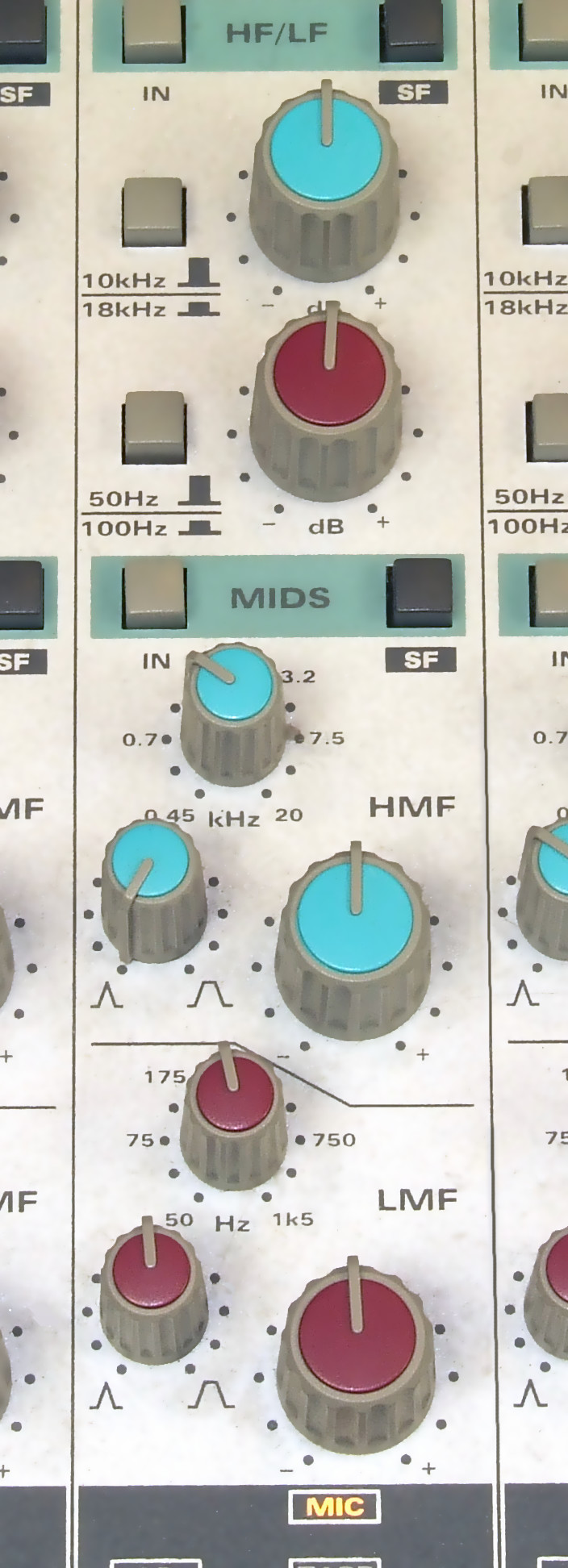
The equalizer-section from the Audient ASP8024 Mixing console. The upper section has high- and low-shelving EQ; the lower section has fully parametric EQ.

Parametric equalizers are multi-band variable equalizers that allow users to control the three primary filter parameters: gain, center frequency and bandwidth. Gain allows adjustment of boost or cut produced. The center frequency controls the frequencies affected. The bandwidth (which is inversely related to Q) controls the range of frequencies affected. Parametric equalizers are capable of making much more precise adjustments than other equalizers and are commonly used in sound recording and live sound reinforcement.

A variant of the parametric equalizer is the semi-parametric equalizer, a sweepable filter. It allows users to control the gain and frequency but uses a pre-set bandwidth. In some cases, semi-parametric equalizers allow the user to select between a wide and a narrow preset bandwidth.

== Filter functions ==
A first-order low-pass (high-cut) filter implemented using only a resistor and capacitor

The responses of linear filters are mathematically described in terms of their transfer function or, in layman's terms, frequency response. A transfer function can be decomposed as a combination of first-order responses and second-order responses (implemented as biquad sections). These can be described according to their pole and zero frequencies, which are complex numbers in the case of second-order responses.

=== First-order filters ===
Two first-order shelving filters: a −3dB bass cut (red), and a +9dB treble boost (blue)

A first-order filter can alter the response of frequencies above and below a point. In the transition region, the filter response will have a slope of up to 6 dB per octave. The bass and treble controls in a hi-fi system are each a first-order filter in which the balance of frequencies above and below a point are varied using a single knob. A special case of first-order filters is a first-order high-pass or low-pass filter in which the 6 dB per octave cut of low or high frequencies extends indefinitely. These are the simplest of all filters to implement individually, requiring only a capacitor and resistor.

=== Second-order filters ===
Second-order filter responses

Second-order filters are capable of resonance (or anti-resonance) around a particular frequency. The response of a second-order filter is specified not only by its frequency but also by its Q; a higher Q corresponds to a sharper response (smaller bandwidth) around a particular center frequency. For instance, the red response in the accompanying image cuts frequencies around 100 Hz with a higher Q than the blue response, which boosts frequencies around 1000 Hz. Higher Q's correspond to resonant behaviour in which the half-power or −3 dB bandwidth, BW, is given by:

$$BW \ = \ F_0 / Q$$

where F_{0} is the resonant frequency of the second-order filter. BW is the bandwidth expressed in the same frequency unit that F_{0} is. Low Q filter responses (where Q < 1/2) are not said to be resonant, and the above formula for bandwidth does not apply.

It is also possible to define the Q of a band-pass function as:

$$Q \ = \ \frac{\sqrt{2^N}}{2^N - 1} \ = \ \frac{1}{2 \sinh\left(\frac{\ln(2)}{2} N \right)},$$

where N is the bandwidth in octaves. The reverse mapping is:

$$N \ = \ 2 \log_2\left( \frac{1}{2Q} + \sqrt{\frac{1}{4Q^2} + 1} \right) \ = \ \frac{2}{\ln(2)} \operatorname{arsinh}\left( \frac{1}{2Q} \right).$$

A second-order filter response with Q of less than 1/2 can be decomposed into two first-order filter functions, a low-cut and a high-cut (or boost). Of more interest are resonant filter functions which can boost (or cut) a narrow range of frequencies. In addition to specifying the center frequency F_{0} and the Q, the specification of the filter's zeros determines how much that frequency band will be boosted (or cut). Thus, a parametric equalizer section will have three controls for its center frequency F_{0}, bandwidth or Q, and the amount of boost or cut usually expressed in dB.

The range of second-order filter functions is important because any analog filter function can be decomposed into a (usually small) number of these (plus, perhaps, simpler first-order responses). These are implemented directly by each section of a parametric equalizer, where they are explicitly adjusted. And each element of a graphic equalizer based on a filter bank includes one such element per band whose Q and F_{0} is not adjustable by the user.

== Uses ==
In sound recording, equalization may be used to adjust frequency responses for practical or aesthetic reasons, where the result typically is intentionally unequal volume levels for the different frequencies. For example, equalization is used to modify an instrument's sound or make certain instruments and sounds more prominent. A recording engineer may use an equalizer to make some high pitches in a vocal part louder while making low pitches in a drum part quieter.

Equalization is commonly used to increase the depth of a mix, creating the impression that some sounds in a mono or stereo mix are farther away or closer than others. Equalization is also commonly used to give tracks with similar frequency components complementary spectral contours, known as mirrored equalization. Selected components of parts that would otherwise compete, such as bass guitar and kick drum, are boosted in one part and cut in the other, and vice versa, so that they both stand out.

Equalizers can correct problems posed by a room's acoustics, as an auditorium will generally have an uneven frequency response, especially due to standing waves and acoustic dampening. For instance, the frequency response of a room may be analyzed using a spectrum analyzer and a pink noise generator. Then a graphic equalizer can be adjusted to compensate for the room's acoustics. Such compensation can also be applied to tweak the sound quality of a recording studio in addition to its use in live sound reinforcement systems and even home hi-fi systems.

During live events where signals from microphones are amplified and sent to speaker systems, equalization is not only used to adjust the frequency response for a natural sound but may also be useful in eliminating feedback. When a microphone picks up the sound produced by the speakers, it is further reamplified; this recirculation of sound can lead to distortions from an unpleasant resonant sound to full-volume howling, requiring the sound technician to reduce the gain for that microphone, perhaps sacrificing the contribution of a singer's voice, for instance. But because the feedback is troublesome at a particular frequency, it is possible to cut the gain only around that frequency. This can be done using a parametric equalizer tuned to the frequency. By adjusting the equalizer attenuation in a narrow bandwidth (high Q), most other frequency components will not be affected. The extreme case when the signal at the filter's center frequency is eliminated is known as a notch filter.

An equalizer can be used to correct or modify the frequency response of a loudspeaker system rather than designing the speaker itself to have the desired response. For instance, the Bose 901 speaker system does not use separate larger and smaller drivers to cover the bass and treble frequencies. Instead, it uses nine drivers, all of the same four-inch diameter. However, this speaker system is sold with an active equalizer which, when inserted into the signal chain, produces the response intended by the manufacturer.

Tone controls (usually designated bass and treble) are simple shelving filters included in most hi-fi equipment for gross adjustment of the frequency balance. The bass control may be used, for instance, to increase the drum and bass parts at a dance party, or to reduce annoying bass sounds when listening to a person speaking. The treble control might be used to give the percussion a sharper or more brilliant sound, or can be used to cut such high frequencies when they have been overemphasized in the program material, to reduce accompanying high-frequency noise, or simply to accommodate a listener's preference.

A rumble filter is a high-pass (low-cut) filter with a cutoff typically in the 20 to 40 Hz range; this is the low-frequency end of human hearing. Rumble is a type of low-frequency noise produced in record players and turntables, particularly older or low-quality models. The rumble filter prevents this noise from being amplified and sent to the loudspeakers. Some cassette decks have a switchable subsonic filter feature that does the same thing for recordings.

A crossover network is a system of filters designed to direct electrical energy separately to the woofer and tweeter of a 2-way speaker system (and also to the mid-range speaker of a 3-way system). This is most often built into the speaker enclosure and hidden from the user. However, in bi-amplification, these filters operate on the line-level audio signals, sending the low-frequency and high-frequency signal components to separate amplifiers, which connect to the woofers and tweeters, respectively.

Equalization is used in a reciprocal manner in certain communication channels and recording technologies. The original music is passed through a particular filter to alter its frequency balance, followed by the channel or recording process. At the end of the channel or when the recording is played, a complementary filter is inserted that precisely compensates for the original filter and recovers the original waveform. For instance, FM broadcasting uses a pre-emphasis filter to boost the high frequencies before transmission, and every receiver includes a matching de-emphasis filter to restore them. The white noise that is introduced by background noise picked up by the radio is then also de-emphasized at the higher frequencies (where it is most noticeable) along with the pre-emphasized program, making the noise less audible. Tape recorders use the same approach to reduce tape hiss while maintaining fidelity. In contrast, in the production of vinyl records, a filter is used to reduce the amplitude of low frequencies, which otherwise produce large amplitudes on the tracks of a record. This allows the groove to take up less physical space, fitting more music on the record. The preamplifier attached to the phono cartridge has a complementary filter boosting those low frequencies, following the standard RIAA equalization curve.

== See also ==
- Loudness compensation
- Weighting filter

== General sources ==
- Glen Ballou, "Filters and equalizers", Handbook for Sound Engineers, Fourth edition, Focal Press, 2008 ISBN 0-240-80969-6.
