= Smiley face curve =

Frequency response curve

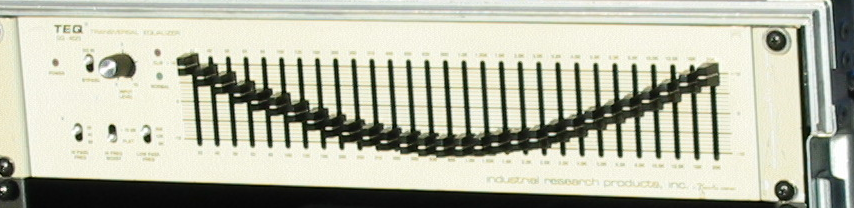
An idealized and extreme smiley face curve shown using a 29-band graphic equalizer

A smiley face curve or mid scoop in audio signal processing is a target frequency response curve characterized by boosted low and high frequencies coupled with reduced midrange frequency power. This curve is often attained by users employing a graphic equalizer, which shows a graphic representation of a "smile" using its frequency band faders to form a curve that sweeps upwards at each end of the frequency spectrum. Smiley face curves have been popular with some car audio enthusiasts, disc jockeys, electric bass players, home stereo owners and sound reinforcement operators. Though the graphic equalizer was intended to tailor a system's response to compensate for venue and performance conditions, the smiley face curve is sometimes applied as a purely stylistic effect.

== Equal-loudness contour ==

The smiley face curve is roughly analogous to the frequency response of human hearing as charted in the equal-loudness contour, and has been compared to loudness compensation circuitry in that it increases the relative power of high and low frequencies without increasing the midrange power. In order for a sound system to be heard properly, it should have an equal-loudness contour applied to it when it is performing at low sound pressure levels, then the curve should gradually flatten out as it gets louder.

== Usage ==
The origin of the smiley face curve has been attributed to the search for more bass and treble response from loudspeakers that did not extend as low or as high as desired, especially in the 1970s and 1980s. It has also been seen as either a useful or a detrimental tool for shaping the sound of a bass guitar.

=== Car audio ===
Many cars which have a graphic equalizer have been observed to have it set as a smiley face curve which emphasizes low and high frequencies. Graphic equalizer use leading to speaker damage is common — large amounts of bass boost and treble boost can distort music and damage loudspeaker drivers. Ideally, the equalizer can be set once to compensate for the combination of the response of the speakers and the car's acoustic characteristics. A smiley face curve can indicate that a car's sound system is lacking both high and low frequency response.

=== Bass guitar ===
Certain styles of electric bass playing, especially slapping, tend to augment the midrange frequencies. Various compensations have been developed to counteract excess midrange response in the instrument, including the use of amplifiers with a built-in smiley face curve and amplifiers that offer a handful of graphic equalizer filters so that the user can make the necessary adjustments when appropriate.

Gallien-Krueger makes an instrument amplifier that produces a classic smiley face curve in its default voicing. However, it includes tone controls that can be adjusted so that the amplifier is within 0.5 dB of a neutral, uncolored frequency response.

Some bass players decry the attenuation of midrange frequencies, holding that the midrange area centered on 500 Hz will make the bass instrumental line stand out more satisfyingly in the mix. University of Iowa professor and bass player Dan Berkowitz has observed that the smiley face curve as applied to bass played within a blues or R&B band can make it hard for bandmates to play off the bass line. Berkowitz recommends an upside down smile curve: a "frown" curve with its peak centered at 500–800 Hz.

Guitarists and bassists can choose to equalize their instrument with an effects pedal. Several products exist for this purpose such as a 10-band MXR-branded equalizer offered by Dunlop Manufacturing which includes instructions for a "Metal Distortion" setting that reduces 1,000 Hz, a midrange frequency, down to its maximum reduction point, with nearby frequencies reduced in the form of a mid scoop.

=== Live sound reinforcement ===
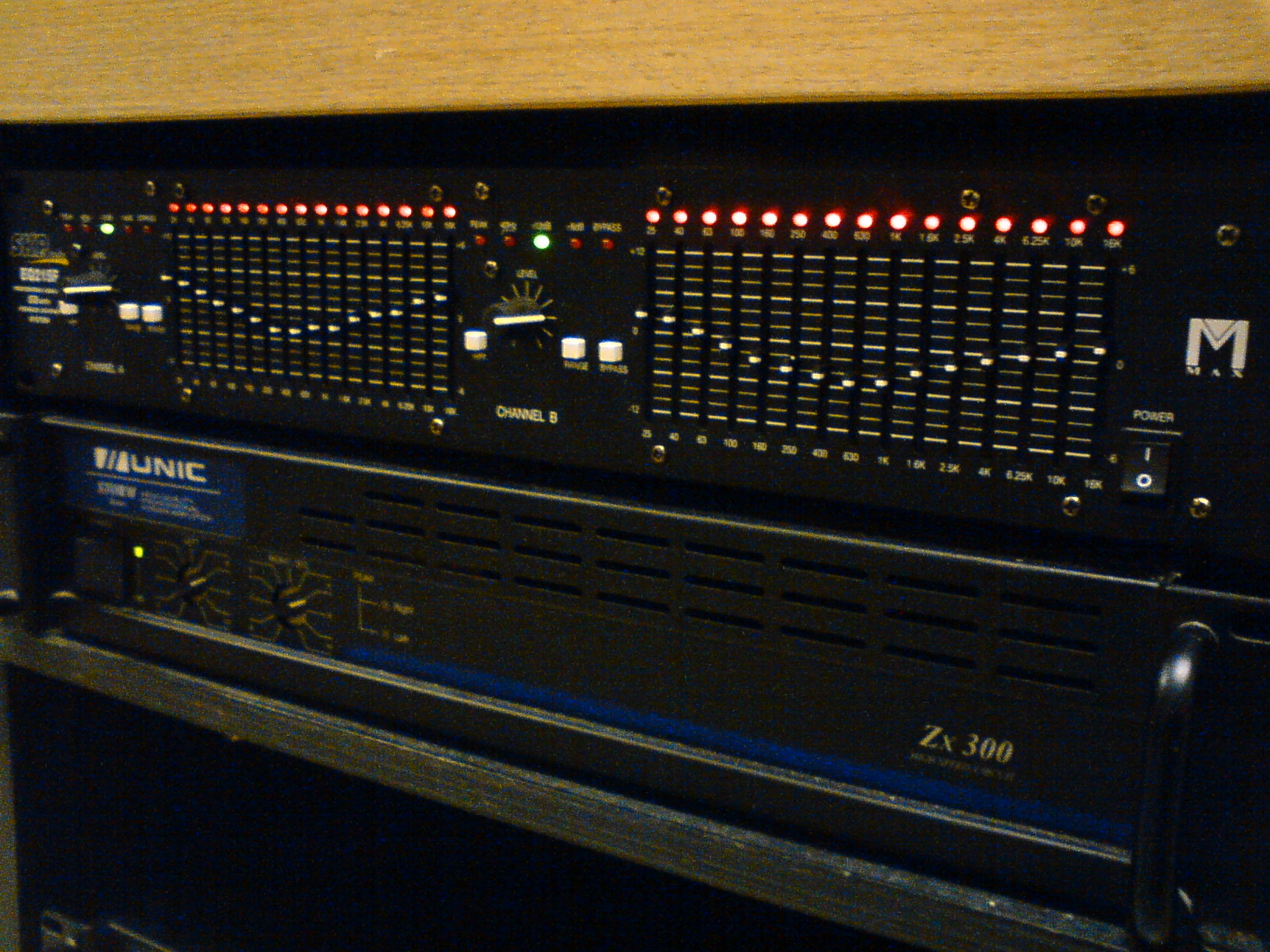
A stereo 15-band equalizer showing modest smiley face curves

Some concert sound mixers employ the smiley face curve as a tool to help them gain initial control of a sound system. Even with recorded sound, the smiley face curve has its backers. Will Shapland of Floating Earth location recorders said in 2004 that his basic mixing technique for the recordings of the Isle of Wight Festival was to use "a bit of a 'smiley-face' EQ curve on the output" until he got a handle on a new band's mix, at which point he said "your balance comes together and you don't really need it."

Kip Bradford of Expert Village emphasizes that the live sound engineer must not employ smiley face curves when setting up a sound reinforcement system. Bradford advises that the graphic equalizer should instead be used to "tune the system to the room", taking account of the combined frequency response of the room and the sound system to ensure that all audible frequencies have equal presence.

== Manufacturer presets ==
Some audio equipment manufacturers have accommodated the user by engineering a smiley face curve into a product. dbx, Inc. offers several smiley face curve presets in their digital graphic equalizer product line called DriveRack. Jim Dunlop offers a direct box intended for bass players that includes a preset labeled "color" which engages a smiley face curve. Neither of these products prevent the user from adjusting the equalizer based on the sound that is actually heard rather than relying on a predetermined visual image.

Alpine Electronics has offered for sale a product for car audio systems that works to counteract any smiley face curve that was applied to a car's factory OEM sound system, along with an analysis feature that adjusts for road and vehicle noise. Empeg Car, a digital media player, includes a "Loudness Control" feature that is described as adding a "smiley face" curve automatically" at low sound levels but which is used to lesser and lesser degrees as the car sound system's volume is increased. This describes an equal-loudness contour circuit.

== See also ==
- Audio system measurements
- Listener fatigue
- Smiling curve, a business concept that charts value relative to market position
