= LARES =

LARES is an electronic sound enhancement system that uses microprocessors to control multiple loudspeakers and microphones placed around a performance space for the purpose of providing active acoustic treatment. LARES was invented in Massachusetts in 1988, by Dr David Griesinger and Steve Barbar who were working at Lexicon, Inc. LARES was given its own company division in 1990, and LARES Associates was formed in 1995 as a separate corporation. Since then, hundreds of LARES systems have been used in concert halls, opera houses performance venues, and houses of worship from outdoor music festivals to permanent indoor symphony halls.

Early versions of LARES were incorporated into prefabricated practice room products offered by Wenger Corporation, and related sound-shaping algorithms, based on the LARES research, have been implemented by Lexicon for home and professional listening spaces. In 2008, LARES was reorganized into E-coustic Systems. This coincided with a change from previous proprietary hardware to Intel server class processors and hardware. In addition, new algorithms were developed based on research into human perception of sound. David Griesinger was awarded the Wallace Clement Sabine Medal by the Acoustical Society of America for this body of work.

== History ==
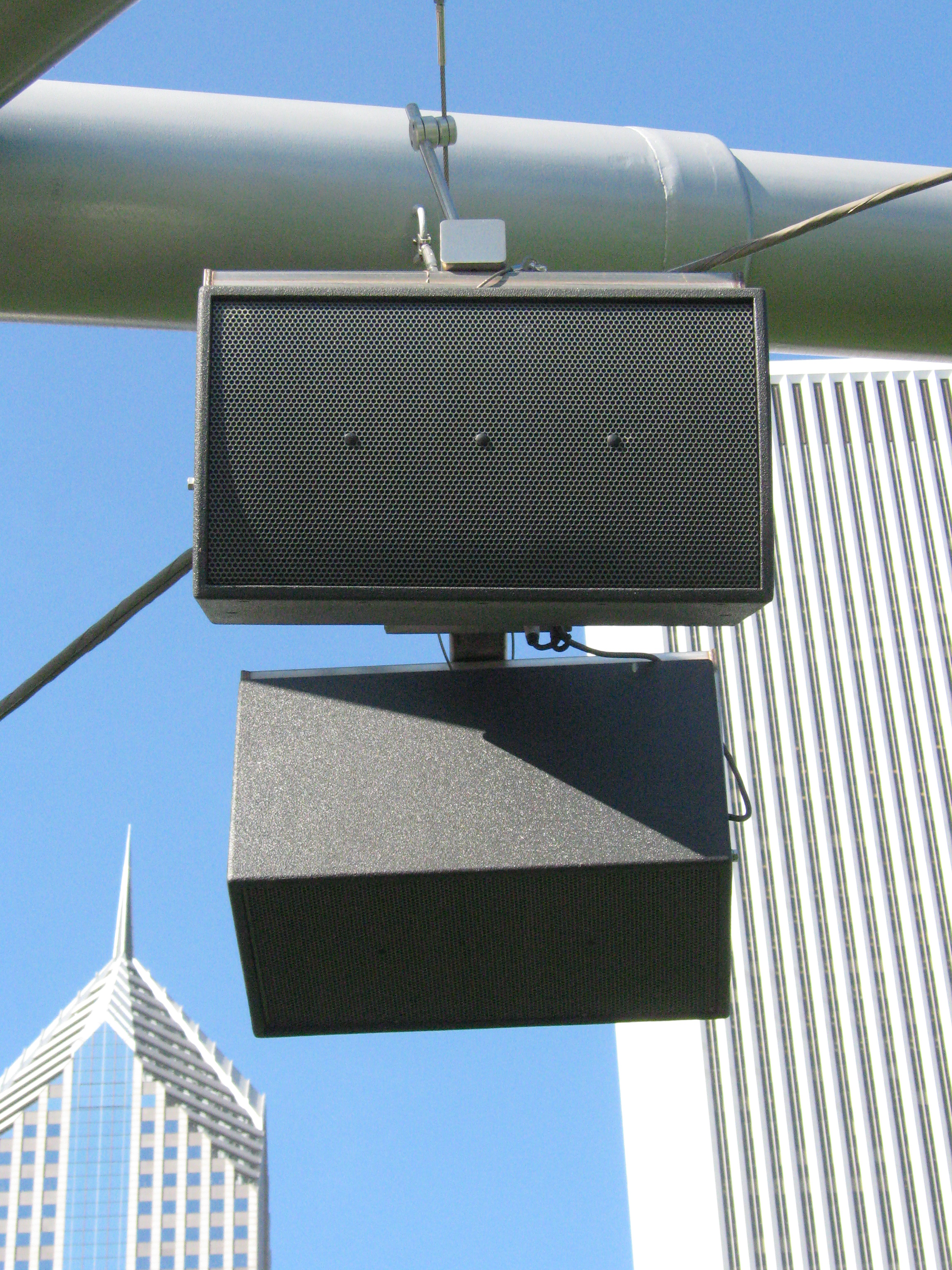
The first permanent LARES outdoor speakers at Jay Pritzker Pavilion

Dr. David Griesinger and Steve Barbar developed LARES in 1988 while working at Lexicon, originally located in Waltham, Massachusetts. Lexicon had become respected for its digital reverberation products used for professional sound recording and concert sound reinforcement. The name LARES is an acronym of Lexicon Acoustic Reinforcement and Enhancement System. In 1989, Griesinger and Barbar, at the request of acousticians Neil Muncy and Robert Tanner, installed the first production LARES system in the Elgin Theatre in Toronto. This initial system used two microphones placed at the balcony's front edge to pick up sound from the stage. The microphone signals were treated electronically, and the resulting signals were sent to 116 loudspeakers positioned in the ceiling and under the balcony. Griesinger presented a technical paper on the concept, process and results to the Audio Engineering Society. A primary component of the electronic treatment was the addition of enough digital delay to make the enhanced loudspeaker output wave arrive at its target seating area at the same time or soon after the direct sound from the stage. Reverberation was digitally synthesized and added to the signal, and patented time variant signal processing was employed to overcome coloration from acoustic feedback between the microphones and loudspeakers. Two LARES mainframes were used, one for the 60 underbalcony speakers and one for the 56 loudspeakers in the main ceiling.

On April 28, 1992, Griesinger was issued a patent for LARES entitled "Electroacoustic system". In 1993, LARES was nominated for but did not win a TEC Award in the category of "Signal Processing Technology".

=== LARES Associates ===
In 1995, LARES Associates was established in Belmont, Massachusetts to differentiate the LARES product from the rest of Lexicon's product line. Since that time, hundreds of LARES systems have been installed throughout the world in performing arts centers, concert halls, opera houses, houses of worship, arenas, recording studios, conference rooms, sound stages, and outdoor concert venues.

At the Vienna Festival in May, 1995, a LARES system was used outdoors to augment the Vienna Philharmonic's performance of Beethoven's Symphony No. 9 conducted by Zubin Mehta. Tens of thousands of concert-goers, for the first time, did not criticize the music as being spoiled by amplification. The sound company bought the LARES system for annual usage at the festival. In 1999, LARES was used in a similar fashion in an outdoor production of Turandot at the Forbidden City performed in China at the Imperial Shrine just outside the Forbidden City; staged by Oscar-nominated film director Zhang Yimou and again conducted by Zubin Mehta.

Some performance venues had their LARES system installed with no fanfare. The Brooklyn Academy of Music acquired their Howard Gilman Opera House system in the summer of 1997 but made no public announcement. Authorization for the purchase came from then-president Harvey Lichtenstein, who told a reporter in 1999 "Our feeling is that people have a prejudice against this kind of thing; they think that to use such a system is kind of faking it. We really don't think that's true." Mark London, director of capital projects was reported as saying "The system has added an amazing amount of warmth to the orchestra and significantly altered the acoustics of the hall." London stated that LARES was not turned on for opera, only for orchestra and theater performances.

LARES Associates added a company website on May 24, 1998.

In 2003, Barbar was asked to return to a LARES installation he had just left, the Sunset Center in Carmel, California, as its new acoustic signature was perceived as being too long and too detailed. Bruno Weil, conductor of the Carmel Bach Festival, had requested Barbar to emulate within the Sunset Center the acoustics of a large church. Formerly characterized as having "sponge-like acoustics", the Sunset Center's LARES-enhanced acoustics made coughs and rustlings from the audience be heard too loudly on stage, and reverberation in the audience area was likened to "the Grand Canyon" by one observer. The City of Carmel paid US$10,000 for Barbar's extra ten days of tuning the system. With the assistance of Carmel Bach Festival management, the system was re-tuned with favorable results. Music critic Scott MacClelland wrote: "The search for the optimal acoustic in the Sunset auditorium continues. A controversial electronic enhancement system was built into the renovation – to compensate for some inherent shortcomings of the room — and was freshly tweaked by its designer before this year’s festival began. (It was even further adjusted between the opening Saturday night program and the Sunday matinee under review.) Most of the undesirable artifacts of the original tuning are now gone, and the sonic imagery today may be as good as it gets."

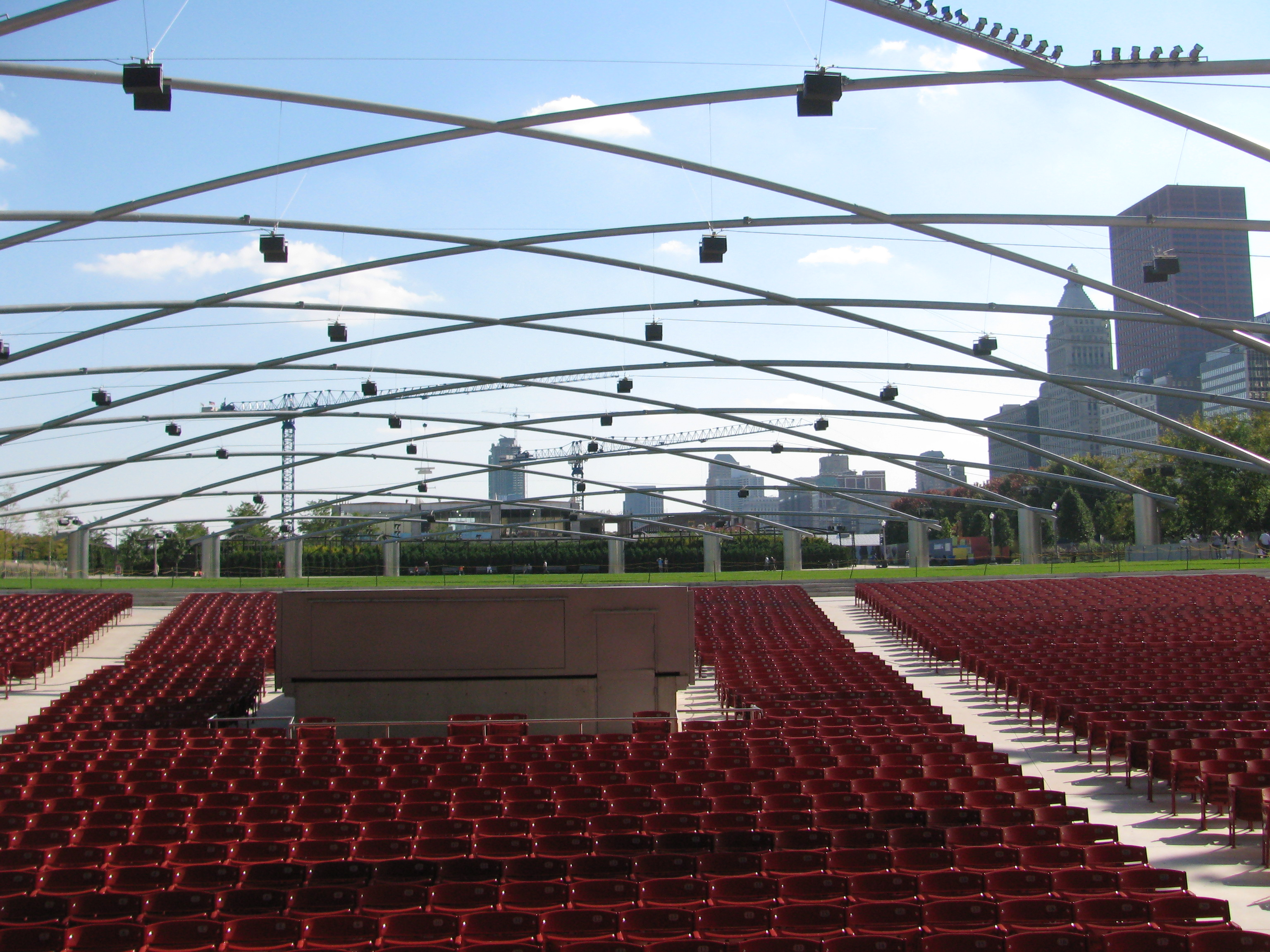
LARES loudspeakers are attached to the steel trellis at Jay Pritzker Pavilion; view from the stage looking out at the audience

The Jay Pritzker Pavilion received the first permanent outdoor LARES system in the US in 2004. The very visible system is held above the audience of 11,000 on a slender network of curved steel tubes called a "trellis" by architect Frank Gehry. LARES loudspeakers are positioned adjacent to the normal distributed sound system loudspeakers, to bring appropriately delayed reinforcement sound as well as synthesized ambience to each listener. Steve Robinson of classical radio station WFMT said "I have never in my life heard sound projected so faithfully and beautifully over such a great distance... It was an ethereal experience."

=== Wenger Corp. ===
Ron Freiheit, director of acoustic research at Wenger Corporation in Owatonna, Minnesota, began to work with LARES system concepts and components as a way to enhance the acoustic products and services that Wenger offered. Barbar, Griesinger and Russ Berger of Russ Berger Design Group (RBDG) were involved in the research and development of products that were integrated into prefabricated sound isolating rooms built by Wenger. By 1998, Wenger was advertising their V-Room product on LARES Associates website. V-Room was a product that allowed the electronic enhancement of music rehearsal spaces, giving the option of having the room's reverberation characteristics model a variety of performance spaces. On September 16, 2005, Freiheit filed a patent on an "Active acoustics performance shell" which used a LARES central digital processor "as manufactured by Lares Associates, Inc., Columbia, Md". Wenger filed a contract suit against LARES Associates on April 26, 2006, in Minneapolis. Currently, Wenger sells sound isolation rooms and "Virtual Acoustic Environment" equipment to give a varied acoustic experience to practice room usage.

=== E-coustic Systems ===
After researching and developing new applications of electronic acoustic treatment, LARES Associates had more than the standard LARES system to offer their customers. In 2008, they reformed into E-coustic Systems, remaining in Belmont. In addition to LARES, E-coustic Systems offers LARES Viva, a conference room acoustic treatment system as well as an array of sound reinforcement components suitable for implementation within an architectural acoustic design.

=== Lexicon ===
Lexicon continues to benefit from its initial LARES research and development. Lexicon currently offers a scaled-down and simplified microprocessor controller, the MC-12, intended for auditory enhancement within home and professional listening spaces. The system is called Lexicon LIVE.

== See also ==
- Architectural acoustics
- Digital room correction
- Reverberation
- Room acoustics

== Technical papers ==
- AES 90th Convention. February 19–22, 1991. David Griesinger, Lexicon. Improving Room Acoustics Through Time-Variant Synthetic Reverberation
- Steve Barbar, Lexicon Inc. November 10, 1995. Further Development in the Design, Implementation, and Performance OF Time Variant Acoustic Enhancement Systems. Presented at the 1994 IOA Windermere Conference
- David Griesinger. Lexicon. Beyond MLS – Occupied hall measurement with FFT techniques 1994
- David Griesinger. Lexicon. How Loud Is My Reverberation. 1995
- David Griesinger. Lexicon. Spaciousness and envelopment in musical acoustics. 1996
- David Griesinger. Lexicon. Further Investigation into the Loudness of Running Reverberation 1996
- David Griesinger. Lexicon. Objective Measures of Spaciousness and Envelopment. 1998
- David Griesinger. Lexicon. Recent Experiences with Electronic Acoustic Enhancement in Concert Halls and Opera Houses 1999
