= Smiling curve =

Concept in business management theory

In business management theory, the smiling curve is a graphical depiction of how value added varies across the different stages of bringing a product on to the market in an IT-related manufacturing industry. The concept was first proposed around 1992 by Stan Shih, the founder of Acer Inc., an IT company headquartered in Taiwan. According to Shih's observation, in the personal computer industry, the two ends of the value chain – conception and marketing – command higher values added to the product than the middle part of the value chain – manufacturing. If this phenomenon is presented in a graph with a Y-axis for value-added and an X-axis for value chain (stage of production), the resulting curve appears like a "smile".

Based on this model, the Acer company adopted a business strategy to reorient itself from manufacturing into global marketing of brand-name PC-related products and services. Acer accordingly invested heavily in R&D to develop innovative technology. The concept later became widely cited to describe the distribution of value-adding potentials in other types of industry to justify business strategies aimed at higher value-adding activities.

== Theory origins ==
BYD's Wang once lamented that Chinese companies had only learned how to organize workers, but had not learned how to organize engineers, and therefore could only make a living in the most inhospitable terrain - manufacturing. If it could use advanced methods to organize a large number of engineers, then Chinese industry would be more profitable. Typically, knowledge-intensive organizations can find ways to organize engineers. Management expert Peter Drucker said: "The most important management in the 21st century is to manage those intelligent workers." This is the most successful aspect of what Huawei has done among Chinese companies. Among its employees, technology research and developing staff accounted for 46%, marketing and service staff accounted for 33%, management and other personnel accounted for 9%, and the remaining 12% are manufacturing workers. For 20 years, Huawei has maintained this ratio, and its human resource allocation shows “high developing and marketing on both sides" of the "smile curve."

=== Competitive pressure of globalization ===
Given the trend of globalization of high-tech product markets, the term "chase, catch, run, jump, touch" can be used to describe the competitive pressures of the industry. Competitive enterprises continue to catch up, ready to catch up with the leaders, and those leading companies continue to run forward in order to stay ahead, and finding methods to jump over the barriers. Therefore, the market becomes saturated, with only price competition. This is the fate of global competition, only the fittest companies survive.

=== Pressure of product life period ===
High-tech products rapidly produce a smaller percentage of revenue unless they are improved and developed continually. This puts a premium on innovation for companies which wish to remain profitable. Lack of upgrading can therefore lead to a loss-making position.

=== Pressure of value-added ===
The value-added of an enterprise can be said to represent the potential for profit. Mature technology, low cost requirement for entry, and universalization of technology make it easy found a so-called "low-profit" enterprise, also known as low-value-added industries. Normal manufacturing and assembly enterprises are low-value-added industries, and in order to survive, can only keep expanding production capacity to maintain profits. But as long as the market is shrinking and/or product prices are decreasing, sales income will no longer be growing..

=== Trend of industries development ===
In order to overcome the pressure of low added value, enterprise's only recourse is to move towards high-value added industry trends. Mastering the key technology and key components is high added value; general manufacturing or OEM is low added value; product integration service also produce high added value.

== Applications Inspiration ==
Smile curve theory seeks to show that the success of products is inextricably related to concept, research, brand spreading and marketing. Those factors require the company to hire and retain highly skilled, intelligent, professionals. Typically, those professionals will be highly paid, so that countries with high smile curve slope companies will generate a higher GDP, therefore generating growing gaps between countries.

=== Comparing developing and development countries ===
The United States and other developed countries have maintained highly slope of the smile curve; however developing countries such as India and China have previously been confined to low-level employing and manufacturing. Therefore, if developing countries want to achieve the high slopes of the smile curve, they need more professional analysts, researchers and brand developers to reach higher levels of economic growth. In other words, if developing countries want to compete with developed countries equally, they must use a highly skilled and knowledge workforce, government needs to invest heavily and support higher education.

== Academic contributions ==
In recent years, researchers have further explored the implications of the smile curve within the context of global value chains (GVCs). A key contribution is from Meng Bo, who in his 2020 paper “Measuring Smile Curves in Global Value Chains” applied input-output analysis to map how value-added activities within GVCs are distributed across countries. Meng's research challenges traditional views of the smile curve by demonstrating that, since 2001, developing countries have become the largest contributors to the growth in total value-added within GVCs, particularly in nations like China.

Meng’s findings highlight the shift in global value creation and responsibility for emissions, offering new insights into both the economics of GVCs and the implications for climate policy. His work adds depth to the understanding of how GVCs reshape global trade dynamics and the distribution of value across nations, suggesting that the roles of developing countries in both manufacturing and high-value activities are growing.

== Related to industry ==
=== Developing countries ===
Some developing countries have begun the development of trade and investment liberalization, and their companies' internal production network has become globalized. Depending on the strengths of each country, manufacturing in the developing countries is generally labor-intensive, which means that they only provide low wages to workers, but high-tech jobs, such as research and development, are to be restricted to the developed countries.

=== Traditional manufacturing ===
Fareed Zakaria's writings mention, the significance of China and its traditional manufacturing dominance; China's manufacturing industry is in the middle stages, so that means production, plus some spare parts supply and engineering design. However, developed countries such as the United States has two complete forms, so that the curve shows the value added profits at every stage. With the end of the Cold War and the former socialist countries' absorption into the global economy, there was more and more cheap labor, so developing countries have been watching their profits decline, then resulting in fierce competition and decreasing the value of manufacturing further.

=== Analyze six sectors ===
The assembly-type manufacturing industry also can be analyzed from:

1. household electronic appliances,
2. household electric appliances,
3. electronic computing equipment and accessory devices,
4. communications equipment,
5. passenger motor cars,
6. trucks, buses and other vehicles.

In this research, the smile curve explained the household electronic appliances, computer equipment and ancillary equipment, as well as the three sectors trucks, buses and other vehicles. However, the smile curve cannot explain the other three sectors, and assembly-type manufacturing industry as a whole.
