= BIBO stability =

When a system's outputs are bounded for every bounded input

In signal processing, specifically control theory, bounded-input, bounded-output (BIBO) stability is a form of stability for signals and systems that take inputs. If a system is BIBO stable, then the output will be bounded for every input to the system that is bounded.

A signal is bounded if there is a finite value $B > 0$ such that the signal magnitude never exceeds $B$, that is

For discrete-time signals: $\exists B \forall n(\ |y[n]| \leq B) \quad n \in \mathbb{Z}$
For continuous-time signals: $\exists B \forall t(\ |y(t)| \leq B) \quad t \in \mathbb{R}$

== Time-domain condition for linear time-invariant systems ==
=== Continuous-time necessary and sufficient condition ===
For a continuous time linear time-invariant (LTI) system, the condition for BIBO stability is that the impulse response, $h(t)$ , be absolutely integrable, i.e., its L^{1} norm exists.

$$\int_{-\infty}^\infty \left|h(t)\right|\,\mathord{\operatorname{d}}t = \| h \|_1 \in \mathbb{R}$$

=== Discrete-time sufficient condition ===
For a discrete time LTI system, the condition for BIBO stability is that the impulse response be absolutely summable, i.e., its $\ell^1$ norm exists.

$$\ \sum_{n=-\infty}^\infty |h[n]| = \| h \|_1 \in \mathbb{R}$$

==== Proof of sufficiency ====
Given a discrete time LTI system with impulse response $\ h[n]$ the relationship between the input $\ x[n]$ and the output $\ y[n]$ is

$$\ y[n] = h[n] * x[n]$$

where $*$ denotes convolution. Then it follows by the definition of convolution

$$\ y[n] = \sum_{k=-\infty}^\infty h[k] x[n-k]$$

Let $\| x \|_{\infty}$ be the maximum value of $\ |x[n]|$, i.e., the $L_{\infty}$-norm.

$$\left|y[n]\right| = \left|\sum_{k=-\infty}^\infty h[n-k] x[k]\right|$$

$\le \sum_{k=-\infty}^\infty \left|h[n-k]\right| \left|x[k]\right|$ (by the triangle inequality)

$$\begin{align}
& \le \sum_{k=-\infty}^\infty \left|h[n-k]\right| \| x \|_\infty \\
& = \| x \|_{\infty} \sum_{k=-\infty}^\infty \left|h[n-k]\right| \\
& = \| x \|_{\infty} \sum_{k=-\infty}^\infty \left|h[k]\right|
\end{align}$$

If $h[n]$ is absolutely summable, then $\sum_{k=-\infty}^{\infty}{\left|h[k]\right|} = \| h \|_1 \in \mathbb{R}$ and

$$\| x \|_\infty \sum_{k=-\infty}^\infty \left|h[k]\right| = \| x \|_\infty \| h \|_1$$

So if $h[n]$ is absolutely summable and $\left|x[n]\right|$ is bounded, then $\left|y[n]\right|$ is bounded as well because $\| x \|_{\infty} \| h \|_1 \in \mathbb{R}$.

The proof for continuous-time follows the same arguments.

== Frequency-domain condition for linear time-invariant systems ==
=== Continuous-time signals ===
For a rational and continuous-time system, the condition for stability is that the region of convergence (ROC) of the Laplace transform includes the imaginary axis. When the system is causal, the ROC is the open region to the right of a vertical line whose abscissa is the real part of the "largest pole", or the pole that has the greatest real part of any pole in the system. The real part of the largest pole defining the ROC is called the abscissa of convergence. Therefore, all poles of the system must be in the strict left half of the s-plane for BIBO stability.

This stability condition can be derived from the above time-domain condition as follows:

$$\begin{align}
\int_{-\infty}^\infty \left|h(t)\right| \, dt
& = \int_{-\infty}^\infty \left|h(t)\right| \left| e^{-j \omega t }\right| \, dt \\
& = \int_{-\infty}^\infty \left|h(t) (1 \cdot e)^{-j \omega t} \right| \, dt \\
& = \int_{-\infty}^\infty \left|h(t) (e^{\sigma + j \omega})^{- t} \right| \, dt \\
& = \int_{-\infty}^\infty \left|h(t) e^{-s t} \right| \, dt
\end{align}$$

where $s = \sigma + j \omega$ and $\operatorname{Re}(s) = \sigma = 0.$

The region of convergence must therefore include the imaginary axis.

=== Discrete-time signals ===
For a rational and discrete time system, the condition for stability is that the region of convergence (ROC) of the z-transform includes the unit circle. When the system is causal, the ROC is the open region outside a circle whose radius is the magnitude of the pole with largest magnitude. Therefore, all poles of the system must be inside the unit circle in the z-plane for BIBO stability.

This stability condition can be derived in a similar fashion to the continuous-time derivation:

$$\begin{align}
\sum_{n = -\infty}^\infty \left|h[n]\right|
& = \sum_{n = -\infty}^\infty \left|h[n]\right| \left| e^{-j \omega n} \right| \\
& = \sum_{n = -\infty}^\infty \left|h[n] (1 \cdot e)^{-j \omega n} \right| \\
& =\sum_{n = -\infty}^\infty \left|h[n] (r e^{j \omega})^{-n} \right| \\
& = \sum_{n = -\infty}^\infty \left|h[n] z^{- n} \right|
\end{align}$$

where $z = r e^{j \omega}$ and $r = |z| = 1$.

The region of convergence must therefore include the unit circle.

== See also ==
- LTI system theory
- Finite impulse response (FIR) filter
- Infinite impulse response (IIR) filter
- Nyquist plot
- Routh–Hurwitz stability criterion
- Bode plot
- Phase margin
- Root locus method
- Input-to-state stability
