= Causal system =

System where the output depends only on past and current inputs

In control theory, a causal system (also known as a physical or nonanticipative system) is a system where the output depends on past and current inputs but not future inputs—i.e., the output $y(t_{0})$ depends only on the input $x(t)$ for values of $t \le t_{0}$.

The idea that the output of a function at any time depends only on past and present values of input is defined by the property commonly referred to as causality. A system that has some dependence on input values from the future (in addition to possible dependence on past or current input values) is termed a non-causal or acausal system, and a system that depends solely on future input values is an anticausal system. Note that some authors have defined an anticausal system as one that depends solely on future and present input values or, more simply, as a system that does not depend on past input values.

Classically, nature or physical reality has been considered to be a causal system. Physics involving special relativity or general relativity require more careful definitions of causality, as described elaborately in Causality (physics).

The causality of systems also plays an important role in digital signal processing, where filters are constructed so that they are causal, sometimes by altering a non-causal formulation to remove the lack of causality so that it is realizable. For more information, see causal filter.

For a causal system, the impulse response of the system must use only the present and past values of the input to determine the output. This requirement is a necessary and sufficient condition for a system to be causal, regardless of linearity. Note that similar rules apply to either discrete or continuous cases. By this definition of requiring no future input values, systems must be causal to process signals in real time.

== Mathematical definitions ==
Definition 1: A system mapping $x$ to $y$ is causal if and only if, for any pair of input signals $x_{1}(t)$, $x_{2}(t)$ and any choice of $t_{0}$, such that

$$x_{1}(t) = x_{2}(t), \quad \forall \ t < t_{0},$$

the corresponding outputs satisfy

$$y_{1}(t) = y_{2}(t), \quad \forall \ t < t_{0}.$$

Definition 2: Suppose $h(t)$ is the impulse response of any system $H$ described by a linear constant coefficient differential equation. The system $H$ is causal if and only if

$$h(t) = 0, \quad \forall \ t <0$$

otherwise it is non-causal.

== Examples ==
The following examples are for systems with an input $x$ and output $y$.

=== Examples of causal systems ===
- Memoryless system

$$y \left( t \right) = x \left( t \right) \cos \left( \omega t \right)$$

- Memory-enabled system

$$y \left( t \right) = x \left( t \right) \cos \left( \omega t \right) - x \left( t -\tau \right)$$

- Autoregressive filter

$$y \left( t \right) = \int_0^\infty x(t-\tau) e^{-\beta\tau}\,d\tau$$

=== Examples of non-causal (acausal) systems ===
$$y(t)=\int_{-\infty}^\infty \sin (t+\tau) x(\tau)\,d\tau$$

- Central moving average

$$y_n=\frac{1}{2}\,x_{n-1}+\frac{1}{2}\,x_{n+1}$$

=== Examples of anti-causal systems ===
$$y(t) =\int _0^\infty x (t+\tau)\,d\tau$$

- Look-ahead

$$y_n=x_{n+1}$$

=== Additional examples of causal systems ===
- Linear Time-Invariant (LTI) System

$$y(t) = \int_{-\infty}^{t} x(\tau) h(t - \tau) \, d\tau$$

- Moving average filter

$$y[n] = \frac{1}{N} \sum_{k=0}^{N-1} x[n-k]$$

=== Additional examples of non-causal (acausal) systems ===
- Smoothing Filter

$$y(t) = \frac{1}{T} \int_{t - T/2}^{t + T/2} x(\tau) \, d\tau$$

- Ideal low-pass filter

$$y(t) = \int_{-\infty}^{\infty} x(\tau) \mathrm{sinc}(t - \tau) \, d\tau$$

=== Additional examples of anti-causal systems ===
- Future Input Dependence

$$y(t) = \int_{t}^{\infty} x(\tau) \, d\tau$$

== See also ==
- Causal filter
- Causal model
