= Nonrecursive filter =

Technique in mathematics and signal processing

In mathematics, a nonrecursive filter only uses input values like x[n − 1], unlike recursive filter where it uses previous output values like y[n − 1].

In signal processing, non-recursive digital filters are often known as Finite Impulse Response (FIR) filters, as a non-recursive digital filter has a finite number of coefficients in the impulse response h[n].

Examples:

- Non-recursive filter: y[n] = 0.5x[n − 1] + 0.5x[n]
- Recursive filter: y[n] = 0.5y[n − 1] + 0.5x[n]

An important property of non-recursive filters is, that they will always be stable. This is not always the case for recursive filters.
