= Impulse invariance =

Impulse invariance is a technique for designing discrete-time infinite-impulse-response (IIR) filters from continuous-time filters in which the impulse response of the continuous-time system is sampled to produce the impulse response of the discrete-time system. The frequency response of the discrete-time system will be a sum of shifted copies of the frequency response of the continuous-time system; if the continuous-time system is approximately band-limited to a frequency less than the Nyquist frequency of the sampling, then the frequency response of the discrete-time system will be approximately equal to it for frequencies below the Nyquist frequency.

== Discussion ==
The continuous-time system's impulse response, $h_c(t)$, is sampled with sampling period $T$ to produce the discrete-time system's impulse response, $h[n]$.

$$h[n]=Th_c(nT)\,$$

Thus, the frequency responses of the two systems are related by

$$H(e^{j\omega}) = \frac{1}{T}    \sum_{k=-\infty}^\infty{ TH_c\left(j\frac{\omega}{T} + j\frac{2{\pi}}{T}k\right)}\,$$

If the continuous time filter is approximately band-limited (i.e. $H_c(j\Omega) < \delta$ when $|\Omega| \ge \pi/T$), then the frequency response of the discrete-time system will be approximately the continuous-time system's frequency response for frequencies below π radians per sample (below the Nyquist frequency 1/(2T) Hz):

$H(e^{j\omega}) = H_c(j\omega/T)\,$ for $|\omega| \le \pi\,$

=== Comparison to the bilinear transform ===
Note that aliasing will occur, including aliasing below the Nyquist frequency to the extent that the continuous-time filter's response is nonzero above that frequency. The bilinear transform is an alternative to impulse invariance that uses a different mapping that maps the continuous-time system's frequency response, out to infinite frequency, into the range of frequencies up to the Nyquist frequency in the discrete-time case, as opposed to mapping frequencies linearly with circular overlap as impulse invariance does.

=== Effect on poles in system function ===
If the continuous poles at $s = s_k$, the system function can be written in partial fraction expansion as

$$H_c(s) = \sum_{k=1}^N{\frac{A_k}{s-s_k}}\,$$

Thus, using the inverse Laplace transform, the impulse response is

$$h_c(t) = \begin{cases}
\sum_{k=1}^N{A_ke^{s_kt}},  & t \ge 0 \\
0, & \mbox{otherwise}
\end{cases}$$

The corresponding discrete-time system's impulse response is then defined as the following

$$h[n] = Th_c(nT)\,$$

$$h[n] = T \sum_{k=1}^N{A_ke^{s_knT}u[n]}\,$$

Performing a z-transform on the discrete-time impulse response produces the following discrete-time system function

$$H(z) = T \sum_{k=1}^N{\frac{A_k}{1-e^{s_kT}z^{-1}}}\,$$

Thus the poles from the continuous-time system function are translated to poles at z = e^{s_{k}T}. The zeros, if any, are not so simply mapped.

=== Poles and zeros ===
If the system function has zeros as well as poles, they can be mapped the same way, but the result is no longer an impulse invariance result: the discrete-time impulse response is not equal simply to samples of the continuous-time impulse response. This method is known as the matched Z-transform method, or pole–zero mapping.

=== Stability and causality ===
Since poles in the continuous-time system at s = s_{k} transform to poles in the discrete-time system at z = exp(s_{k}T), poles in the left half of the s-plane map to inside the unit circle in the z-plane; so if the continuous-time filter is causal and stable, then the discrete-time filter will be causal and stable as well.

=== Corrected formula ===
When a causal continuous-time impulse response has a discontinuity at $t=0$, the expressions above are not consistent. This is because $h_c (0)$ has different right and left limits, and should really only contribute their average, half its right value $h_c (0_+)$, to $h[0]$.

Making this correction gives

$$h[n] = T \left( h_c(nT) - \frac{1}{2}  h_c(0_+)\delta [n] \right) \,$$

$$h[n] = T \sum_{k=1}^N{A_ke^{s_knT}} \left( u[n] - \frac{1}{2} \delta[n] \right) \,$$

Performing a z-transform on the discrete-time impulse response produces the following discrete-time system function

$$H(z) = T \sum_{k=1}^N{\frac{A_k}{1-e^{s_kT}z^{-1}} - \frac{T}{2} \sum_{k=1}^N A_k}.$$

The second sum is zero for filters without a discontinuity, which is why ignoring it is often safe.

== See also ==
- Bilinear transform
- Matched Z-transform method
- Oppenheim, Alan V. and Schafer, Ronald W. with Buck, John R. Discrete-Time Signal Processing. Second Edition. Upper Saddle River, New Jersey: Prentice-Hall, 1999.
- Sahai, Anant. Course Lecture. Electrical Engineering 123: Digital Signal Processing. University of California, Berkeley. 5 April 2007.
- Eitelberg, Ed. "Convolution Invariance and Corrected Impulse Invariance." Signal Processing, Vol. 86, Issue 5, pp. 1116–1120. 2006
