= Molypermalloy powder core =

Toroidal magnetic core comprised from the powder of multiple alloys

A molypermalloy powder (MPP) core is a toroidal magnetic core comprised from the powder of multiple alloys. It is distributed with air gaps to help condense its magnetic field to minimize core losses. Its composition is made from approximately 79% nickel, 17% iron, and 4% molybdenum.

It maintains the lowest core losses out of all the magnetic powdered cores used. Its relative permeability can range from 14 to 550 (see: permeabilities of common materials).

== Production ==
Molybdenum permalloy powder is made by grinding hot-rolled and embrittled cast ingots; then, the alloy is insulated and screened to a fineness of 120 mesh for use in audio frequency applications, and 400 mesh for use at high frequencies.

== Use ==
Toroidal powder cores are used in the development of a subgroup of microelectronics known as inductors, transformers and electronic filters.

An MPP core possesses many positive magnetic qualities which makes it more optimal to use in the creation of such devices. A few of its properties include: low eddy current losses and hysteresis, low permeability changes in high temperatures, high Curie temperature, high electrical resistivity at operating frequency and exemplary inductive stability under both AC and DC currents.

MPP cores are primarily used in inductors that require a core to have higher saturation point while maintaining other valuable magnetic properties. A standard MPP core saturates at around 0.75 tesla. A ferrite core saturates at around 0.45 tesla. Molypermalloy powder cores are commonly used in the making of: flyback transformers, resonant circuits, quartz filters, loading coils, choke coils, pulse transformers, and other industrial and military circuits.

=== Limitations and disadvantages ===
As frequency increases, desired permeability decreases. Thus, when using frequencies higher than 500 kHz MPP cores are often replaced by ferrite cores.

Disadvantages of MPP cores: Due to the complex nature of its manufacturability and tooling feasibility, shapes are limited to a toroidal configuration and these types of cores generally have maximum operating frequency of around 1 MHz.

== History ==
MPP was developed into cores by the Western Electric Company and the Bell Telephone Laboratory (formerly known as AT&T) in the early 1940s. It has made its largest impact in the power conversion field by permitting increased frequency, resulting in weight reduction and increased compactness in computer systems.
