= Bilinear transform =

Signal processing operation

How the bilinear transform maps the z-plane to the s-plane. The unstable regions for the poles of a linear control system are shaded.

The bilinear transform (also known as Tustin's method, after Arnold Tustin) is used in digital signal processing and discrete-time control theory to transform continuous-time system representations to discrete-time and vice versa.

The bilinear transform is a special case of a conformal mapping (namely, a Möbius transformation), often used for converting a transfer function $H_a(s)$ of a linear, time-invariant (LTI) filter in the continuous-time domain (often named an analog filter) to a transfer function $H_d(z)$ of a linear, shift-invariant filter in the discrete-time domain (often named a digital filter although there are analog filters constructed with switched capacitors that are discrete-time filters). It maps positions on the $j \omega$ axis, $\mathrm{Re}[s]=0$, in the s-plane to the unit circle, $|z| = 1$, in the z-plane. Other bilinear transforms can be used for warping the frequency response of any discrete-time linear system (for example to approximate the non-linear frequency resolution of the human auditory system) and are implementable in the discrete domain by replacing a system's unit delays $\left( z^{-1} \right)$ with first order all-pass filters.

The transform preserves stability and maps every point of the frequency response of the continuous-time filter, $H_a(j \omega_a)$ to a corresponding point in the frequency response of the discrete-time filter, $H_d(e^{j \omega_d T})$ although to a somewhat different frequency, as shown in the Frequency warping section below. This means that for every feature that one sees in the frequency response of the analog filter, there is a corresponding feature, with identical gain and phase shift, in the frequency response of the digital filter but, perhaps, at a somewhat different frequency. The change in frequency is barely noticeable at low frequencies but is quite evident at frequencies close to the Nyquist frequency.

== Discrete-time approximation ==
The bilinear transform is a first-order Padé approximant of the natural logarithm function that is an exact mapping of the z-plane to the s-plane. When the Laplace transform is performed on a discrete-time signal (with each element of the discrete-time sequence attached to a correspondingly delayed unit impulse), the result is precisely the Z transform of the discrete-time sequence with the substitution of

$$\begin{align}
z &= e^{sT}   \\
&= \frac{e^{sT/2}}{e^{-sT/2}} \\
&\approx \frac{1 + s T / 2}{1 - s T / 2}
\end{align}$$

where $T$ is the numerical integration step size of the trapezoidal rule used in the bilinear transform derivation; or, in other words, the sampling period. The above bilinear approximation can be solved for $s$ or a similar approximation for $s = (1/T) \ln(z)$ can be performed.

The inverse of this mapping (and its first-order bilinear approximation) is

$$\begin{align}
s &= \frac{1}{T} \ln(z)  \\
&= \frac{2}{T} \left[\frac{z-1}{z+1} + \frac{1}{3} \left( \frac{z-1}{z+1} \right)^3  + \frac{1}{5} \left( \frac{z-1}{z+1} \right)^5  + \frac{1}{7} \left( \frac{z-1}{z+1} \right)^7 + \cdots \right] \\
&\approx  \frac{2}{T} \frac{z - 1}{z + 1} \\
&=  \frac{2}{T} \frac{1 - z^{-1}}{1 + z^{-1}}
\end{align}$$

The bilinear transform essentially uses this first order approximation and substitutes into the continuous-time transfer function, $H_a(s)$

$$s \leftarrow \frac{2}{T} \frac{z - 1}{z + 1}.$$

That is

$$H_d(z) = H_a(s) \bigg|_{s = \frac{2}{T} \frac{z - 1}{z + 1}}= H_a \left( \frac{2}{T} \frac{z-1}{z+1} \right). \$$

== Stability and minimum-phase property preserved ==
A continuous-time causal filter is stable if the poles of its transfer function fall in the left half of the complex s-plane. A discrete-time causal filter is stable if the poles of its transfer function fall inside the unit circle in the complex z-plane. The bilinear transform maps the left half of the complex s-plane to the interior of the unit circle in the z-plane. Thus, filters designed in the continuous-time domain that are stable are converted to filters in the discrete-time domain that preserve that stability.

Likewise, a continuous-time filter is minimum-phase if the zeros of its transfer function fall in the left half of the complex s-plane. A discrete-time filter is minimum-phase if the zeros of its transfer function fall inside the unit circle in the complex z-plane. Then the same mapping property assures that continuous-time filters that are minimum-phase are converted to discrete-time filters that preserve that property of being minimum-phase.

== Transformation of a General LTI System ==
A general LTI system has the transfer function
$$H_a(s) = \frac{b_0 + b_1s + b_2s^2 + \cdots + b_Qs^Q}{a_0 + a_1s + a_2s^2 + \cdots + a_Ps^P}$$
The order of the transfer function N is the greater of P and Q (in practice this is most likely P as the transfer function must be proper for the system to be stable). Applying the bilinear transform
$$s = K\frac{z - 1}{z + 1}$$
where K is defined as either 2/T or otherwise if using frequency warping, gives
$$H_d(z) = \frac{b_0 + b_1\left(K\frac{z - 1}{z + 1}\right) + b_2\left(K\frac{z - 1}{z + 1}\right)^2 + \cdots + b_Q\left(K\frac{z - 1}{z + 1}\right)^Q}
{a_0 + a_1\left(K\frac{z - 1}{z + 1}\right) + a_2\left(K\frac{z - 1}{z + 1}\right)^2 + \cdots + b_P\left(K\frac{z - 1}{z + 1}\right)^P}$$
Multiplying the numerator and denominator by the largest power of (z + 1)^{−1} present, (z + 1)^{−N}, gives
$$H_d(z) = \frac{b_0(z+1)^N + b_1K(z-1)(z+1)^{N-1} + b_2K^2(z-1)^2(z+1)^{N-2} + \cdots + b_QK^Q(z-1)^Q(z+1)^{N-Q}}
{a_0(z+1)^N + a_1K(z-1)(z+1)^{N-1} + a_2K^2(z-1)^2(z+1)^{N-2} + \cdots + a_PK^P(z-1)^P(z+1)^{N-P}}$$
It can be seen here that after the transformation, the degree of the numerator and denominator are both N.

Consider then the pole-zero form of the continuous-time transfer function
$$H_a(s) = \frac{(s - \xi_1)(s - \xi_2) \cdots (s - \xi_Q)}{(s - p_1)(s - p_2) \cdots (s - p_P)}$$
The roots of the numerator and denominator polynomials, ξ_{i} and p_{i}, are the zeros and poles of the system. The bilinear transform is a one-to-one mapping, hence these can be transformed to the z-domain using
$$z = \frac{K + s}{K - s}$$
yielding some of the discretized transfer function's zeros and poles ξ'_{i} and p'_{i}
$$\begin{aligned}
\xi'_i &= \frac{K + \xi_i}{K - \xi_i} \quad 1 \leq i \leq Q \\
p'_i &= \frac{K + p_i}{K - p_i}     \quad 1 \leq i \leq P
\end{aligned}$$
As described above, the degree of the numerator and denominator are now both N, in other words there is now an equal number of zeros and poles. The multiplication by (z + 1)^{−N} means the additional zeros or poles are
$$\begin{aligned}
\xi'_i &= -1 \quad Q < i \leq N \\
p'_i &= -1 \quad P < i \leq N
\end{aligned}$$
Given the full set of zeros and poles, the z-domain transfer function is then
$$H_d(z) = \frac{(z - \xi'_1)(z - \xi'_2) \cdots (z - \xi'_N)}
{(z - p'_1)(z - p'_2) \cdots (z - p'_N)}$$

== Example ==
As an example take a simple low-pass RC filter. This continuous-time filter has a transfer function

$$\begin{align}
H_a(s) &= \frac{1/sC}{R+1/sC} \\
&= \frac{1}{1 + RC s}.
\end{align}$$

If we wish to implement this filter as a digital filter, we can apply the bilinear transform by substituting for $s$ the formula above; after some reworking, we get the following filter representation:

$H_d(z) \$	$=H_a \left( \frac{2}{T} \frac{z-1}{z+1}\right) \$
	$= \frac{1}{1 + RC \left( \frac{2}{T} \frac{z-1}{z+1}\right)} \$
	$= \frac{1 + z}{(1 - 2 RC / T) + (1 + 2RC / T) z} \$
	$= \frac{1 + z^{-1}}{(1 + 2RC / T) + (1 - 2RC / T) z^{-1}}. \$

The coefficients of the denominator are the 'feed-backward' coefficients and the coefficients of the numerator are the 'feed-forward' coefficients used for implementing a real-time digital filter.

== Transformation for a general first-order continuous-time filter ==
It is possible to relate the coefficients of a continuous-time, analog filter with those of a similar discrete-time digital filter created through the bilinear transform process. Transforming a general, first-order continuous-time filter with the given transfer function

$$H_a(s) = \frac{b_0 s + b_1}{a_0 s + a_1} = \frac{b_0 + b_1 s^{-1}}{a_0 + a_1 s^{-1}}$$

using the bilinear transform (without prewarping any frequency specification) requires the substitution of

$$s \leftarrow K \frac{1 - z^{-1}}{1 + z^{-1}}$$

where

$$K \triangleq \frac{2}{T}$$.

However, if the frequency warping compensation as described below is used in the bilinear transform, so that both analog and digital filter gain and phase agree at frequency $\omega_0$, then

$$K \triangleq \frac{\omega_0}{\tan\left(\frac{\omega_0 T}{2}\right)}$$.

This results in a discrete-time digital filter with coefficients expressed in terms of the coefficients of the original continuous time filter:

$$H_d(z)=\frac{(b_0 K + b_1) + (-b_0 K + b_1)z^{-1}}{(a_0 K + a_1) + (-a_0 K + a_1)z^{-1}}$$

Normally the constant term in the denominator must be normalized to 1 before deriving the corresponding difference equation. This results in

$$H_d(z)=\frac{\frac{b_0 K + b_1}{a_0 K + a_1} + \frac{-b_0 K + b_1}{a_0 K + a_1}z^{-1}}{1 + \frac{-a_0 K + a_1}{a_0 K + a_1}z^{-1}}.$$

The difference equation (using the Direct form I) is

$$y[n] = \frac{b_0 K + b_1}{a_0 K + a_1} \cdot x[n] + \frac{-b_0 K + b_1}{a_0 K + a_1} \cdot x[n-1] - \frac{-a_0 K + a_1}{a_0 K + a_1} \cdot y[n-1] \ .$$

== General second-order biquad transformation ==
A similar process can be used for a general second-order filter with the given transfer function

$$H_a(s) = \frac{b_0 s^2 + b_1 s + b_2}{a_0 s^2 + a_1 s + a_2} = \frac{b_0 + b_1 s^{-1} + b_2 s^{-2}}{a_0 + a_1 s^{-1} + a_2 s^{-2}} \ .$$

This results in a discrete-time digital biquad filter with coefficients expressed in terms of the coefficients of the original continuous time filter:

$$H_d(z)=\frac{(b_0 K^2 + b_1 K + b_2) + (2b_2 - 2b_0 K^2)z^{-1} + (b_0 K^2 - b_1 K + b_2)z^{-2}}{(a_0 K^2 + a_1 K + a_2) + (2a_2 - 2a_0 K^2)z^{-1} + (a_0 K^2 - a_1 K + a_2)z^{-2}}$$

Again, the constant term in the denominator is generally normalized to 1 before deriving the corresponding difference equation. This results in

$$H_d(z)=\frac{\frac{b_0 K^2 + b_1 K + b_2}{a_0 K^2 + a_1 K + a_2} + \frac{2b_2 - 2b_0 K^2}{a_0 K^2 + a_1 K + a_2}z^{-1} + \frac{b_0 K^2 - b_1 K + b_2}{a_0 K^2 + a_1 K + a_2}z^{-2}}{1 + \frac{2a_2 - 2a_0 K^2}{a_0 K^2 + a_1 K + a_2}z^{-1} + \frac{a_0 K^2 - a_1 K + a_2}{a_0 K^2 + a_1 K + a_2}z^{-2}}.$$

The difference equation (using the Direct form I) is

$$\begin{aligned}
y[n] = \frac{b_0 K^2 + b_1 K + b_2}{a_0 K^2 + a_1 K + a_2} \cdot x[n] + \frac{2b_2 - 2b_0 K^2}{a_0 K^2 + a_1 K + a_2} \cdot x[n-1] + \frac{b_0 K^2 - b_1 K + b_2}{a_0 K^2 + a_1 K + a_2} \cdot x[n-2] \\ - \frac{2a_2 - 2a_0 K^2}{a_0 K^2 + a_1 K + a_2} \cdot y[n-1] - \frac{a_0 K^2 - a_1 K + a_2}{a_0 K^2 + a_1 K + a_2} \cdot y[n-2] \ .
\end{aligned}$$

== Frequency warping ==
To determine the frequency response of a continuous-time filter, the transfer function $H_a(s)$ is evaluated at $s = j \omega_a$ which is on the $j \omega$ axis. Likewise, to determine the frequency response of a discrete-time filter, the transfer function $H_d(z)$ is evaluated at $z = e^{ j \omega_d T}$ which is on the unit circle, $|z| = 1$. The bilinear transform maps the $j \omega$ axis of the s-plane (which is the domain of $H_a(s)$) to the unit circle of the z-plane, $|z| = 1$ (which is the domain of $H_d(z)$), but it is not the same mapping $z = e^{sT}$ which also maps the $j \omega$ axis to the unit circle. When the actual frequency of $\omega_d$ is input to the discrete-time filter designed by use of the bilinear transform, then it is desired to know at what frequency, $\omega_a$, for the continuous-time filter that this $\omega_d$ is mapped to.

$$H_d(z) = H_a \left( \frac{2}{T} \frac{z-1}{z+1}\right)$$

$H_d(e^{ j \omega_d T})$	$= H_a \left( \frac{2}{T} \frac{e^{ j \omega_d T} - 1}{e^{ j \omega_d T} + 1}\right)$
	$= H_a \left( \frac{2}{T} \cdot \frac{e^{j \omega_d T/2} \left(e^{j \omega_d T/2} - e^{-j \omega_d T/2}\right)}{e^{j \omega_d T/2} \left(e^{j \omega_d T/2} + e^{-j \omega_d T/2 }\right)}\right)$
	$= H_a \left( \frac{2}{T} \cdot \frac{\left(e^{j \omega_d T/2} - e^{-j \omega_d T/2}\right)}{\left(e^{j \omega_d T/2} + e^{-j \omega_d T/2 }\right)}\right)$
	$= H_a \left(j \frac{2}{T} \cdot \frac{ \left(e^{j \omega_d T/2} - e^{-j \omega_d T/2}\right) /(2j)}{\left(e^{j \omega_d T/2} + e^{-j \omega_d T/2 }\right) / 2}\right)$
	$= H_a \left(j \frac{2}{T} \cdot \frac{ \sin(\omega_d T/2) }{ \cos(\omega_d T/2) }\right)$
	$= H_a \left(j \frac{2}{T} \cdot \tan \left( \omega_d T/2 \right) \right)$

This shows that every point on the unit circle in the discrete-time filter z-plane, $z = e^{ j \omega_d T}$ is mapped to a point on the $j \omega$ axis on the continuous-time filter s-plane, $s = j \omega_a$. That is, the discrete-time to continuous-time frequency mapping of the bilinear transform is

$$\omega_a = \frac{2}{T} \tan \left( \omega_d \frac{T}{2} \right)$$

and the inverse mapping is

$$\omega_d = \frac{2}{T} \arctan \left( \omega_a \frac{T}{2} \right).$$

The discrete-time filter behaves at frequency $\omega_d$ the same way that the continuous-time filter behaves at frequency $(2/T) \tan(\omega_d T/2)$. Specifically, the gain and phase shift that the discrete-time filter has at frequency $\omega_d$ is the same gain and phase shift that the continuous-time filter has at frequency $(2/T) \tan(\omega_d T/2)$. This means that every feature, every "bump" that is visible in the frequency response of the continuous-time filter is also visible in the discrete-time filter, but at a different frequency. For low frequencies (that is, when $\omega_d \ll 2/T$ or $\omega_a \ll 2/T$), then the features are mapped to a slightly different frequency; $\omega_d \approx \omega_a$.

One can see that the entire continuous frequency range

$$-\infty < \omega_a < +\infty$$

is mapped onto the fundamental frequency interval

$$-\frac{\pi}{T} < \omega_d < +\frac{\pi}{T}.$$

The continuous-time filter frequency $\omega_a = 0$ corresponds to the discrete-time filter frequency $\omega_d = 0$ and the continuous-time filter frequency $\omega_a = \pm \infty$ correspond to the discrete-time filter frequency $\omega_d = \pm \pi / T.$

One can also see that there is a nonlinear relationship between $\omega_a$ and $\omega_d.$ This effect of the bilinear transform is called frequency warping. The continuous-time filter can be designed to compensate for this frequency warping by setting $\omega_a = \frac{2}{T} \tan \left( \omega_d \frac{T}{2} \right)$ for every frequency specification that the designer has control over (such as corner frequency or center frequency). This is called pre-warping the filter design.

It is possible, however, to compensate for the frequency warping by pre-warping a frequency specification $\omega_0$ (usually a resonant frequency or the frequency of the most significant feature of the frequency response) of the continuous-time system. These pre-warped specifications may then be used in the bilinear transform to obtain the desired discrete-time system. When designing a digital filter as an approximation of a continuous time filter, the frequency response (both amplitude and phase) of the digital filter can be made to match the frequency response of the continuous filter at a specified frequency $\omega_0$, as well as matching at DC, if the following transform is substituted into the continuous filter transfer function. This is a modified version of Tustin's transform shown above.

$$s \leftarrow \frac{\omega_0}{\tan\left(\frac{\omega_0 T}{2}\right)} \frac{z - 1}{z + 1}.$$

However, note that this transform becomes the original transform

$$s \leftarrow \frac{2}{T} \frac{z - 1}{z + 1}$$

as $\omega_0 \to 0$.

The main advantage of the warping phenomenon is the absence of aliasing distortion of the frequency response characteristic, such as observed with Impulse invariance.

== See also ==
- Impulse invariance
- Matched Z-transform method
