= Blind deconvolution =

Signal-processing procedure

In electrical engineering and applied mathematics, blind deconvolution is deconvolution without explicit knowledge of the impulse response function used in the convolution. This is usually achieved by making appropriate assumptions of the input to estimate the impulse response by analyzing the output. Blind deconvolution is not solvable without making assumptions on input and impulse response. Most of the algorithms to solve this problem are based on assumption that both input and impulse response live in respective known subspaces. However, blind deconvolution remains a very challenging non-convex optimization problem even with this assumption.

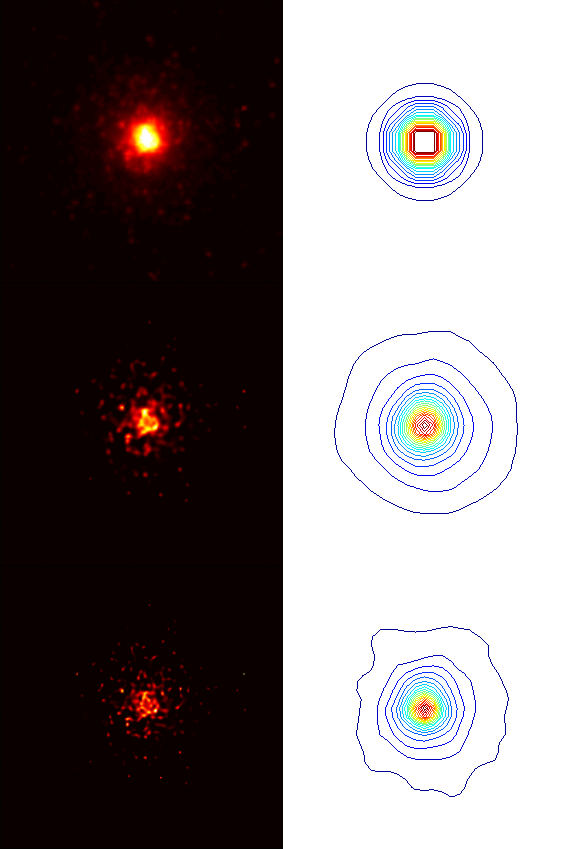
Top left image: NGC224 by Hubble Space Telescope. Top right contour: best fit of the point spread function (PSF) (a priori). Middle left image: Deconvolution by maximum a posteriori estimation (MAP), the 2nd iteration. Middle right contour: Estimate of the PSF by MAP, the 2nd iteration. Bottom left image: Deconvolution by MAP, the final result. Bottom right contour: Estimate of the PSF by MAP, the final result.

== In image processing ==
In image processing, blind deconvolution is a deconvolution technique that permits recovery of the target scene from a single or set of "blurred" images in the presence of a poorly determined or unknown point spread function (PSF). Regular linear and non-linear deconvolution techniques utilize a known PSF. For blind deconvolution, the PSF is estimated from the image or image set, allowing the deconvolution to be performed. Researchers have been studying blind deconvolution methods for several decades, and have approached the problem from different directions.

Most of the work on blind deconvolution started in early 1970s. Blind deconvolution is used in astronomical imaging and medical imaging. In the astronomical case, the assumption is that objects are small points.

Blind deconvolution can be performed iteratively, whereby each iteration improves the estimation of the PSF and the scene, or non-iteratively, where one application of the algorithm, based on exterior information, extracts the PSF. Iterative methods include maximum a posteriori estimation and expectation-maximization algorithms. A good initial estimate of the PSF is helpful for quicker convergence but not necessary.

Examples of non-iterative techniques include SeDDaRA, the cepstrum transform and APEX. The cepstrum transform and APEX methods assume that the PSF has a specific shape, and one must estimate the width of the shape. For SeDDaRA, the information about the scene is provided in the form of a reference image. The algorithm estimates the PSF by comparing the spatial frequency information in the blurred image to that of the target image.

=== Examples ===
Any blurred image can be given as input to blind deconvolution algorithm, it can deblur the image, but essential condition for working of this algorithm must not be violated as discussed above. In the first example (picture of shapes), recovered image was very fine, exactly similar to original image because L > K + N. In the second example (picture of a girl), L < K + N, so essential condition is violated, hence recovered image is far different from original image.

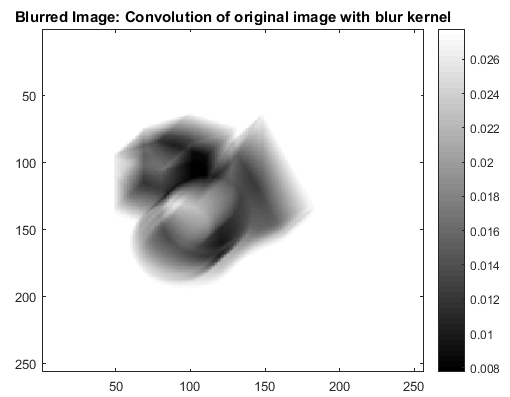
Blurred Image, obtained by convolution of original image with blur kernel. Input image lies in fixed subspace of wavelet transform and blur kernel lies in random subspace.

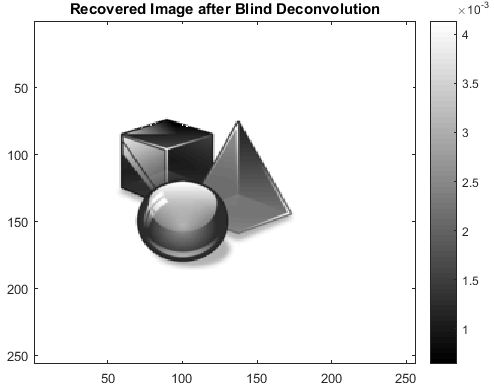
Recovered image after applying algorithm of blind deconvolution. This algorithm basically solves optimization problem using nuclear norm minimization. L=65536, K=65 and N=44838
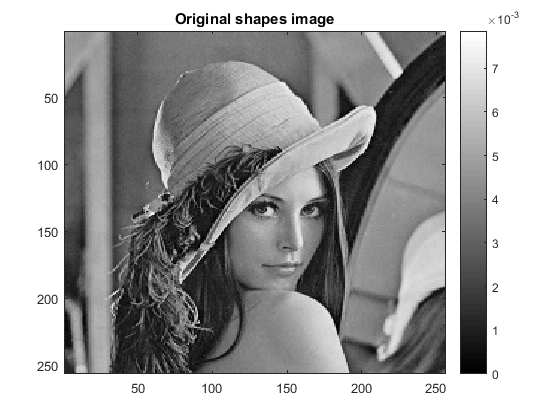
Original image

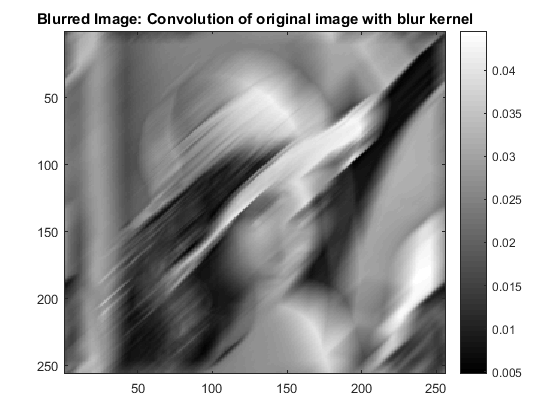
Blurred image: obtained after the convolution of original image with blur kernel. Original image lies in fixed subspace of wavelet transform and blur lies in random subspace. L=65536, K=200, N=65400

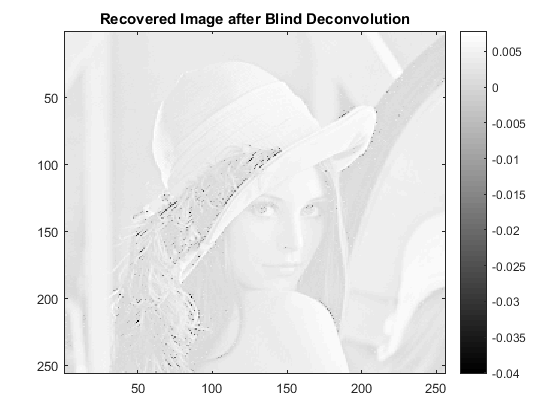
Recovered image: very different from original image, because essential condition for the algorithm of blind deconvolution using nuclear norm minimization is violated. L=65536, K=200, N=65400

== In signal processing ==
=== Seismic data ===
In the case of deconvolution of seismic data, the original unknown signal is made of spikes hence is possible to characterize with sparsity constraints or regularizations such as l_{1} norm/l_{2} norm norm ratios, suggested by W. C. Gray in 1978.

=== Audio deconvolution ===
Audio deconvolution (often referred to as dereverberation) is a reverberation reduction in audio mixtures. It is part of audio processing of recordings in ill-posed cases such as the cocktail party effect. One possibility is to use ICA.

=== In general ===
Suppose we have a signal transmitted through a channel. The channel can usually be modeled as a linear shift-invariant system, so the receptor receives a convolution of the original signal with the impulse response of the channel. If we want to reverse the effect of the channel, to obtain the original signal, we must process the received signal by a second linear system, inverting the response of the channel. This system is called an equalizer.

If we are given the original signal, we can use a supervising technique, such as finding a Wiener filter, but without it, we can still explore what we do know about it to attempt its recovery. For example, we can filter the received signal to obtain the desired spectral power density. This is what happens, for example, when the original signal is known to have no auto correlation, and we "whiten" the received signal.

Whitening usually leaves some phase distortion in the results. Most blind deconvolution techniques use higher-order statistics of the signals, and permit the correction of such phase distortions. We can optimize the equalizer to obtain a signal with a PSF approximating what we know about the original PSF.

=== High-order statistics ===
Blind deconvolution algorithms often make use of high-order statistics, with moments higher than two. This can be implicit or explicit.

== See also ==
- Channel model
- Inverse problem
- Regularization (mathematics)
- Blind equalization
- Maximum a posteriori estimation
- Maximum likelihood
