= Adaptive noise cancelling =

Signal processing technique to reduce noise

Adaptive noise cancelling is a signal processing technique for suppressing interference corrupting a received signal where the interference is known and is accessible but unavoidable and where the target signal and the interference are unrelated. Examples of such situations include:

- a microphone attempting to receive speech near machinery or other noise sources in the environment, such as an aircraft cockpit
- a naval ship towing a sonar array where the ship's own noise masks a much weaker detected target signal
- obtaining a fetal electrocardiogram (ECG) where the presence of the mother's stronger ECG represents an unavoidable interference.

Conventional signal processing techniques pass the received signal, consisting of the target signal and the corrupting interference, through a filter that is designed to minimise the effect of the interference. The objective of optimal filtering is to maximise the signal-to-noise ratio at the receiver output or, as is the case with a Wiener filter, to produce the optimal estimate of the target signal in the presence of interference.

In contrast, adaptive noise cancelling relies on a second sensor, usually located near the source of the known interference, to obtain a relatively pure version of the interference, free from the target signal. This pure version of the interference and the sensor receiving it are called the reference.

The adaptive noise canceller consists of a self-adjusting adaptive filter which automatically transforms the reference signal into an optimal estimate of the interference corrupting the target signal. This is then subtracted from the received signal, thereby cancelling (or minimising) the effect of the interference at the noise canceller output. The adaptive filter adjusts itself continuously and automatically to minimise the residual interference affecting the target signal at its output. The power of the adaptive noise cancelling concept is that it requires no detailed a priori knowledge of the target signal or the interference. The adaptive algorithm that optimises the filter relies only on ongoing sampling of the reference input and the noise canceller output.

== Configuration and concept ==
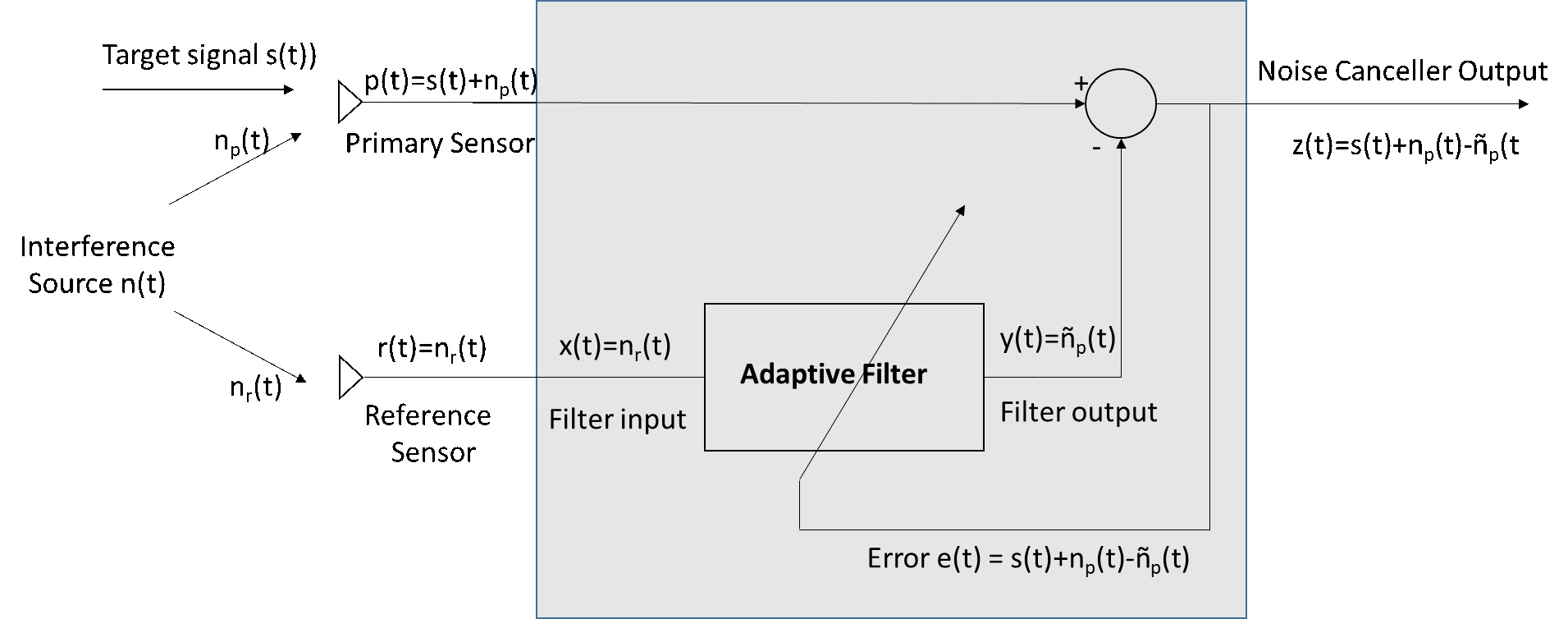
Adaptive filter in noise cancelling configuration

The adaptive noise canceller configuration diagram on this section shows the target signal s(t) present at the primary sensor and the interference or noise source n(t) and its manifestations n_{p}(t) and n_{r}(t) at the primary and reference sensors, respectively.

As n_{p}(t) and n_{r}(t) are the manifestations of the same interference source in different locations, these will usually differ significantly in an unpredictable fashion due to different transmission paths through the environment to the two sensors. So the reference n_{r}(t) cannot be used directly to cancel or reduce the interference corrupting the target signal n_{p}(t). It must first be appropriately processed before it can be used to minimise, by subtraction, the overall effect of the interference at the noise canceller output.

An adaptive noise canceller is based on a self-optimising adaptive filter that has a variable transfer function shaped by adjustable parameters called weights. Using an iterative adaptive algorithm, the adaptive filter transforms the reference n_{r}(t) into an optimal estimate ñ_{p}(t) of the interference n_{p}(t) corrupting the target signal and cancelling the latter by subtraction, whilst leaving the target signal unchanged. So the output of the adaptive noise canceller shown above is:

$z(t) = s(t) + n_p(t) - \tilde{n}_p(t)$.

The power of the adaptive noise-cancelling approach stems from the fact that the algorithm driving the iterative adjustment of weights in an adaptive filter is a simple, fully automatic iterative process that relies only on an ongoing stream of measurements of the noise canceller output and the reference r(t) = n_{r}(t). For example, the least-mean-squares (LMS) algorithm in the context of the usual tapped-delay-line digital adaptive filter (see below) leads to:

$$W_{k+1} = W_k - \mu_k R_k = W_k - \mu z_k N_{r,k}$$

where the vector W_{k} represents the set of filter weights at the k^{th} iteration and the vector R_{k} represents the last set of samples of the reference, which are the weight inputs. The adaptation constant μ determines the rate of adaptation and the stability of the optimal configuration.

Apart from the availability of a suitable reference signal, the only other essential requirement is that the target signal and the corrupting noise source are unrelated, that is uncorrelated, so that $\overline{s(t) n_p(t-\tau)} = 0$ and $\overline{s(t) n_r(t-\tau)} = 0$ for all values of $\tau$, where the overbar represents time averaging.

Adaptive noise cancelling does not require detailed a priori knowledge of the interference or the target signal. However, the physical characteristics of the adaptive filter must be generally suitable for producing an adjustable transfer function that will transform the reference signal n_{r}(t) into a close estimate of the corrupting interference, ñ_{p}(t), through the iterative adjustment of the filter weights.

The adaptive noise cancelling approach, terminology and the proof of the concept, and the first demonstrations that general broadband interference in a target signal can be reduced in practical situations using adaptive noise cancelling, were set out during 1971–72 at the Adaptive Systems Laboratory of the Stanford School of Electrical Engineering by Professor Bernard Widrow and John Kaunitz and documented in the latter's Ph.D. dissertation, Adaptive Filtering of Broadband Signals as Applied to Noise Cancelling and related technical reports.

However, a subsequent 1975 paper published in the Proceedings of the IEEE by Widrow et al., Adaptive Noise Cancelling: Principles and Applications, is now the generally referenced introductory publication in the field. This paper sets out the basic concepts of adaptive noise cancelling and summarises subsequent early work and applications. Earlier unpublished efforts to eliminate interference using a second input are also mentioned. This paper remains the main reference for the adaptive noise cancelling concept and to date has been cited by over 3000 scientific papers and over 400 patents. The topic is also covered by a number of more recent books.

== Genesis ==
Adaptive noise cancelling evolved from the pioneering work on adaptive systems, adaptive filtering and signal processing carried out at the Adaptive Systems Laboratories in the School of Electrical Engineering at Stanford University during the 1960s and 70's under the leadership of Professor Bernard Widrow.

Adaptive filters incorporate adjustable parameters called weights, controlled by iterative adaptive algorithms, to produce a desired transfer function. Adaptive filters were originally conceived to produce the optimal filters prescribed by optimal filter theory during a training phase by adjusting the filter weights according to an iterative adaptive algorithm such as the LMS algorithm. During the training phase, the filter is presented with a known input and a training signal called a desired response.

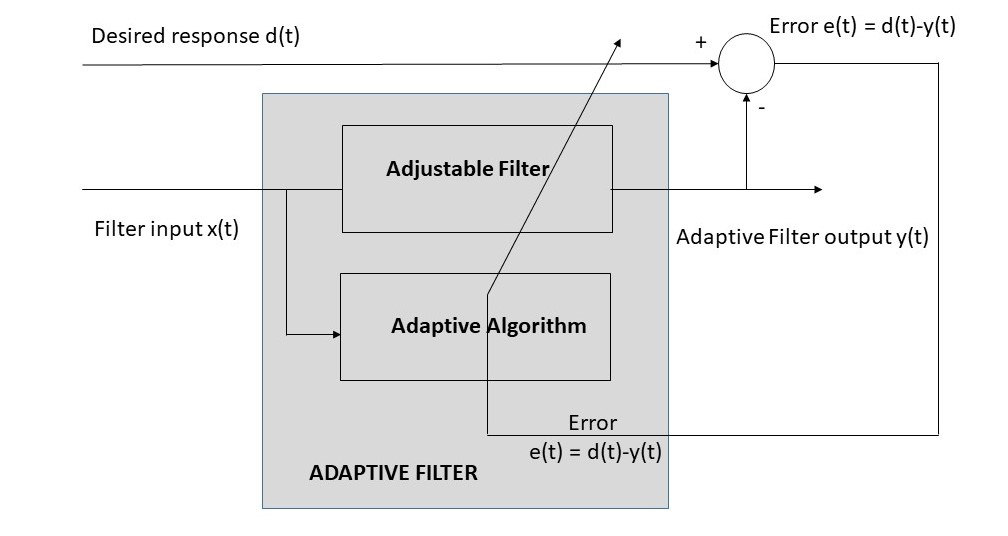
Adaptive filter in training mode

The filter weights are adjusted by the adaptive algorithm, which is designed to minimise the mean-squared-error ξ, the difference between the adaptive filter output and the desired response:

where W represents the set of weights in vector notation and X(t) the set of weight inputs so y(t) = X(t)^{T}W.

The above expression shows ξ to be a quadratic function of the weight vector W, a multi-dimensional paraboloid with a single minimum that can be reached from any point by descending along the gradient. Gradient descent algorithms, such as the original Least Means Squared algorithm, iteratively adjust the filter weights in small steps opposite the gradient. In the case of the usual digital tapped delay line filter, the vector X_{k} is simply the last set of samples of the filter input x(t) and the LMS algorithm results in:

W_{k+1} = W_{k} - μe_{k}X_{k}

where k represents the k^{th} step in the iteration process, μ is the adaptation constant that controls the rate and stability of the adaptation process and e_{k} and X_{k} are samples of the error and the input vector, respectively

At the completion of the training phase, the adaptive filter has been optimised to produce the desired optimal transfer function. In its normal operating phase such an optimised adaptive filter is then used passively to process received signals to improve the signal-to-noise ratio at the filter output under the assumed conditions. The theory and analysis of adaptive filters is largely based on this concept, model and terminology, and took place before the introduction of the adaptive noise cancelling concept around 1970.

Adaptive noise cancelling is an innovation that represents a fundamentally different configuration and application of adaptive filtering in those common situations where a reference signal is available by:

1. using the training mode of the filter as the operational mode, thus continually adjusting the filter during normal operation
2. using the reference as the adaptive filter input
3. using the primary input, the noise canceller input, containing the target signal and interference, as the desired response for the adaptation process
4. using the noise canceller output, that is, the difference between the primary input and the output of the adaptive filter, as the error for adaptation.

Whilst the discussion of adaptive noise cancelling reflects the above terminology, it is clear from the above diagrams that the two are equivalent and the previously developed extensive adaptive filter theory therefore continues to apply in both situations.

In the adaptive noise cancelling situation, the received signal does not pass through the adaptive filter but instead becomes the 'desired response' for adaptation purposes. Since the adaptation process will aim to minimise the error, it follows that, in the noise canceller configuration, the adaptation process in effect aims to minimise the overall signal power at the noise canceller output - the error. So the adaptive filtering of the reference actually strives to suppress the overall signal power at the noise canceller output.

This counterintuitive concept can be understood by keeping in mind that the target signal s(t) and the interference n(t) are uncorrelated. So, in aiming to minimise the error, using a reference as input, which is related only to the interference, the best the adaptive filter can do, in generating an optimal estimate of the primary input, the desired response, is to generate the optimal estimate of the interference at the primary sensor ñ_{p}(t). This will result in minimising the overall effect of the interference at the noise canceller output whilst leaving the target signal s(t) unchanged.

The iterative adaptive algorithms used in adaptive filtering require only an ongoing sequence of sampling measurements at the weight inputs and the error. As digital adaptive filters are in effect tapped-delay-line filters, the operation of an adaptive noise canceller requires only on an ongoing sequence of sampling measurements of the reference and the noise canceller output.

Adaptive filtering theory was developed in the domain of stochastic signals and statistical signal processing. However, repetitive interference typical of noise-cancelling applications, such as machinery noise or ECGs, are more appropriately treated as bounded time-varying signals. A comprehensive analysis of adaptive filters when applied to stochastic signals is presented by Widrow and Stearns in their book Adaptive Signal Processing. In this context, averaging is interpreted as statistical expectation. An analysis of noise cancelling where s(t) and n(t) are assumed to be bounded deterministic signals was presented by Kaunitz in his PhD dissertation, where time averaging is used.

== Original proof of concept demonstrations ==
The first practical demonstration of the adaptive noise-cancelling concept, typical of general practical situations involving broadband signals, was carried out in 1971 at the Stanford School of Electrical Engineering Adaptive Systems Laboratory by Kaunitz using a prototype hybrid adaptive signal processor. The ambient noise from the output of a microphone used by a speaker (the primary sensor) in a very noisy room was largely eliminated using adaptive noise cancellation.

A triangular signal, representing a typical broadband signal, emitted by a loudspeaker situated in the room, was used as the interfering noise source. A second microphone situated near this loudspeaker served to provide the reference input. The output of the noise canceller was channelled to the earphones of a listener outside the room.

The adaptive filter used in these experiments was a hybrid adaptive filter consisting of a preprocessor of 16 RC-filter circuits, which provided the inputs to 16 digitally controlled analogue amplifiers as weights that were summed as a linear combiner to produce the adaptive filter output. This linear combiner interfaced to a small HP 2116B digital computer that ran a version of the LMS algorithm.

The experimental arrangement used by Kaunitz in the photo below shows the loudspeaker emitting the interference, the two microphones used to provide the primary and reference signals, the equipment rack containing the hybrid adaptive filter and the digital interface, and the HP 2116B minicomputer on the right of the picture. (Only some of the equipment in the photo is part of the adaptive noise-cancelling demonstration).

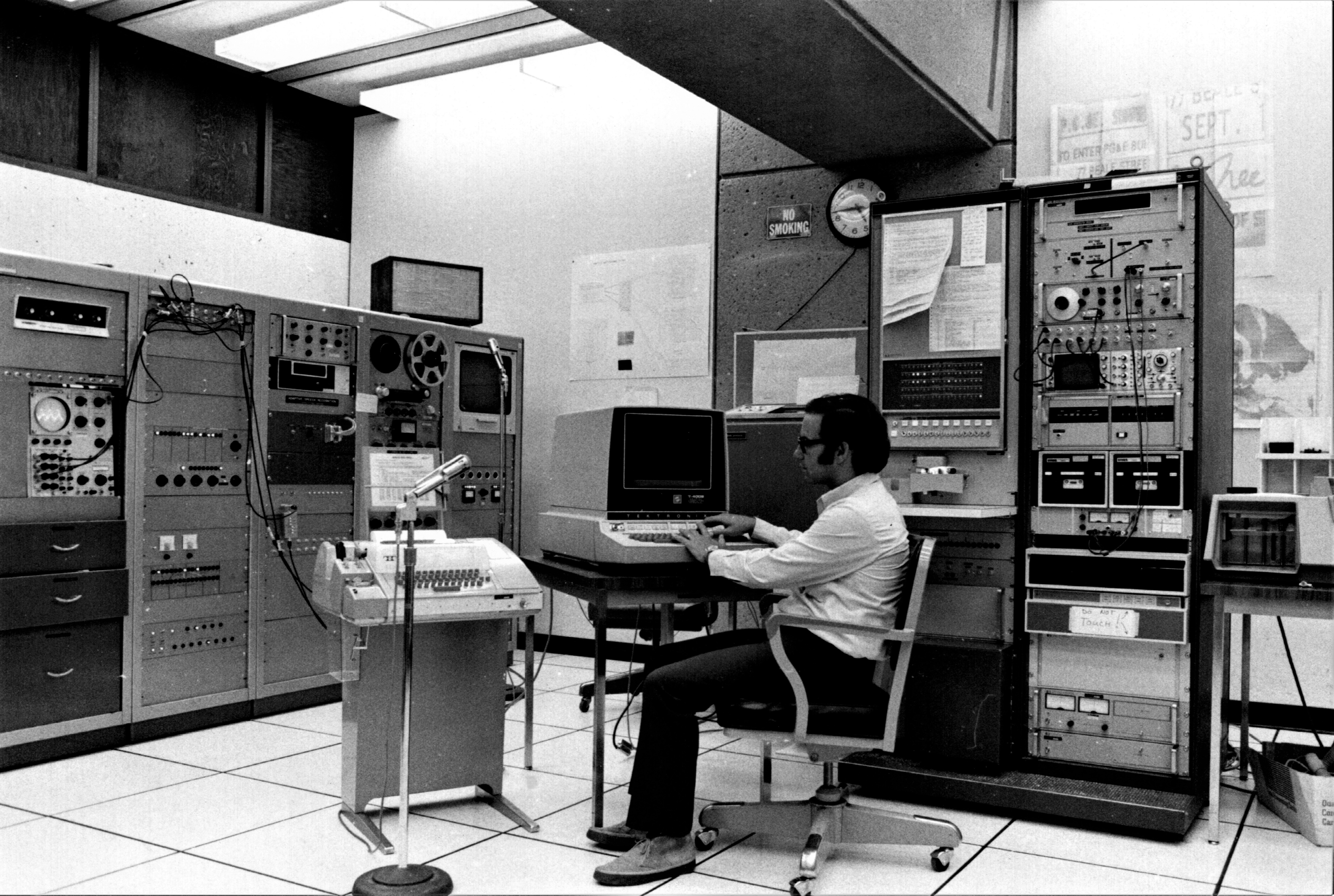
Adaptive noise cancelling demonstration by John Kaunitz at the Adaptive Systems Laboratory, Stanford University in 1971

The noise canceller effectively reduced the ambient noise overlaying the speech signal from an initially almost overwhelming level to barely audible and successfully re-adapted to the change in frequency of the triangular noise source and to changes in the environment when people moved around in the room. Recordings of these demonstrations are still available here and here.

The second application of this original noise canceller was to process ECGs from heart transplant animals studied by the pioneering heart transplant team at the Stanford Medical Centre at the time, led by Dr Norman Shumway. Data was provided by Drs. Eugene Dong and Walter B Cannon in the form of a multi-track magnetic tape recording of electrocardiograms.

In heart transplant recipients, the part of the heart stem that contains the recipient's pacemaker (called the sinoatrial or SA node) remains in place and continues to fire controlled by the brain and the nervous system. Normally, this pacemaker controls the rate at which the heart is beating by triggering the atrioventricular (AV) nodes and thus controlling heart rate to respond to the demands of the body. (See diagram below). In normal patients, this represents a feedback loop, but in transplant patients, the connection between the remnant SA node and the implanted AV node is not re-established and the remnant pacemaker and the implanted heart are beating independently, at differing rates.

The behaviour of the remnant pacemaker in the open-loop situation of a heart transplant patient was of considerable interest to researchers, but studying the ECG of the pacemaker (the p-wave) was made difficult because the weaker signal from the pacemaker was swamped by the signal from the implanted heart even when a bipolar catheter sensor (primary sensor) is inserted through the jugular vein close to the SA-node. (See the third trace from top in the diagram below). The noise-cancelling arrangement to eliminate the effect of the donor heart from the ECG of the p-wave is shown below.

A reference signal was obtained through a limb-to-limb ECG of the patient (See top trace in the diagram below), which provided the main ECG of the donor heart largely free from the pacemaker p-wave. Adaptive noise cancelling was used to transform the reference into an estimate of the donor heart signal present at the primary input (see second trace from top) and used to substantially reduce the effect of the donor heart from the primary ECG (third trace), providing a substantially cleaned-up version of the p-wave at the noise canceller output (see bottom trace) suitable for further study and analysis.

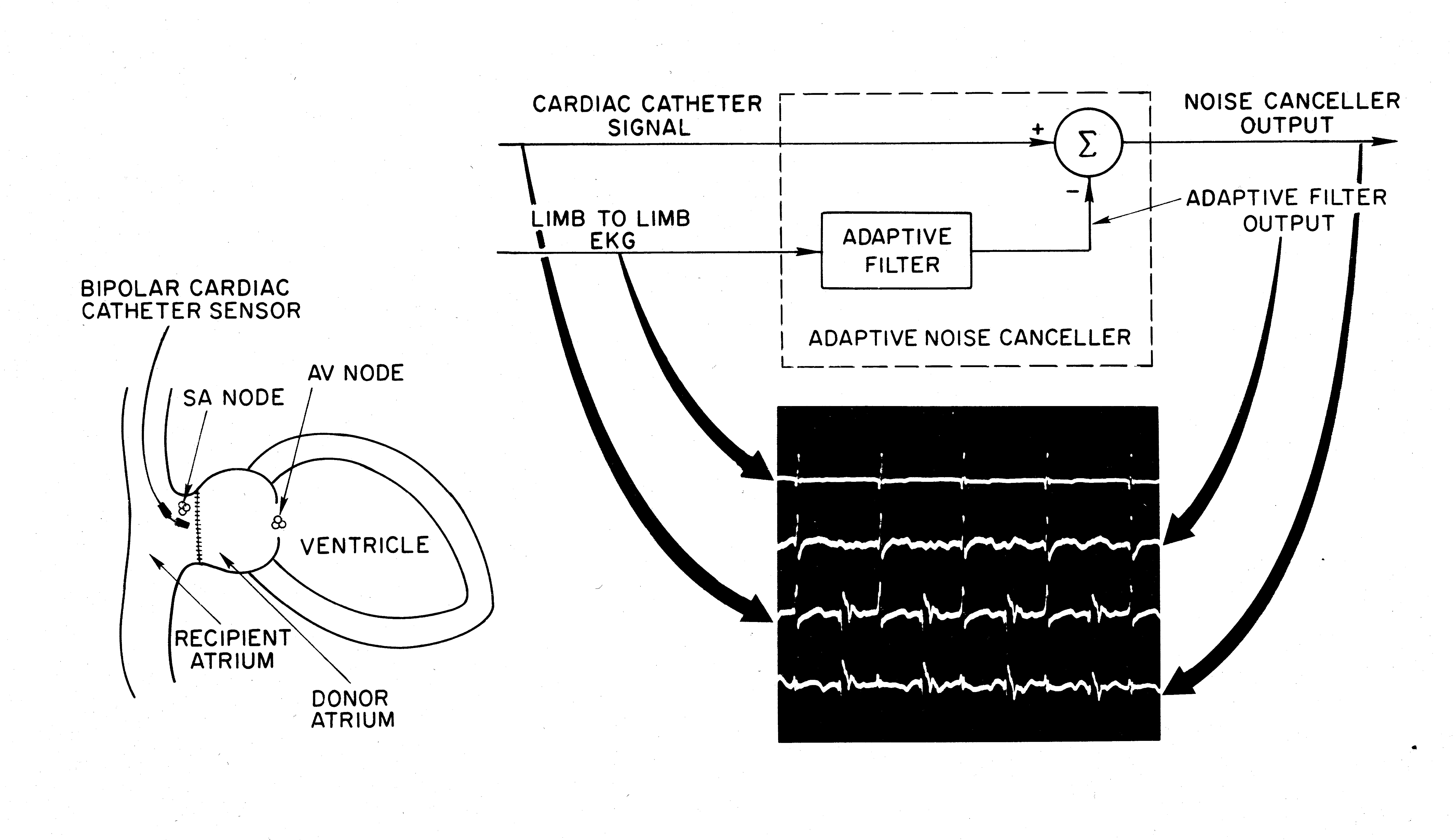
Extracting remnant pacemaker signal from heart transplant ECG

== Applications ==
Adaptive noise-cancelling techniques have found use in a wide range of situations, including the following:

- Eliminating ambient noise from the speech signals of a microphone situated in a noisy environment by using a second microphone situated near the noise source as the reference signal. ( see proof of concept above)
- Eliminating the self-noise of a naval ship towing a sonar array searching for a target signal by using a reference signal of the towing ship's own noise, which can be readily obtained.
- The extraction of the remnant recipient pacemaker signal from a heart transplant animal from an ECG, which also included the stronger ECG signal of the donor heart. (see proof of concept above)
- Similarly, fetal electrocardiograms are received in the presence of the mother's stronger ECG and can be extracted using adaptive noise cancelling to reduce the effect of the mother's ECG.
- Adaptive noise cancelling has also been used to eliminate patient motion artefacts during general ECG measurements
- Adaptive noise cancelling techniques can also been used in the context of Active Noise Control to reduce acoustic noise in a physical space
- Adaptive noise cancelling has also been used in rail surface defect detection.
- Elimination of ambient noise by adaptive noise cancelling in the process of measuring lightning electric field signals
- Cancelling noise in underground mine powerline carrier communication
- Reducing the effect of noise in speech recognition systems
- Improving beam control for the linear collider at the SLAC (Stanford Linear Accelerator Centre)

In these situations, a suitable reference signal can be readily obtained by placing a sensor near the source of the interference or by other means (e.g., a version of the interfering ECG free from the target signal).

Adaptive noise cancelling can be effective even when the target signal and the interference are similar in nature and the interference is considerably stronger than the target signal. Apart from the availability of a suitable reference signal, the only other critical requirement is that the target signal and the corrupting noise source are unrelated, that is uncorrelated, so that for all values of $\tau$, where the bar represents time averaging.

Adaptive noise cancelling does not require detailed a priori knowledge of the interference or the target signal. However, the characteristics of the adaptive filter must be generally suitable for producing an adjustable frequency response or transfer function that is able to transform the reference signal n_{r}(t) into an estimate of the corrupting interference, ñ_{p}(t), through the iterative adjustment of the filter weights. The interference in the above examples are usually irregular repetitive signals. Although the theory of adaptive filtering does not rely on this as an assumption, in practice this characteristic is very helpful as it limits the need for the adaptive filter to compensate for time shifts between the versions of the interference at the primary and reference sensors to appropriately compensate for phase shifts.

== Adaptive noise cancelling and active noise control ==
Adaptive noise cancelling is not the same as active noise control. These terms refer to different areas of scientific investigation in two different disciplines. The term noise has a different meaning in the two contexts.

Active noise control is a method in acoustics to reduce unwanted sound in physical spaces and is an area of research that preceded the development of adaptive noise cancelling. The term noise is used here with its common meaning of unwanted audible sound. The first patent for a noise control system—U.S. patent 2,043,416—was granted to inventor Paul Lueg in 1936. The patent described how to cancel sinusoidal tones in ducts by phase-advancing the wave and canceling arbitrary sounds in the region around a loudspeaker by inverting the polarity.

Adaptive noise cancelling is a technique used in communication and control to reduce the effect of additive interference corrupting an electric or electromagnetic target signal. In this context, noise refers to such interference and the two terms are used interchangeably.

After its development in signal processing, the adaptive noise-cancelling approach was also adopted in active noise control, for example, in some noise-cancelling headphones. The two areas significantly intersect. Nevertheless, active noise control is just one of the many applications of adaptive noise cancelling, and conversely, adaptive noise cancelling is just one of the techniques used in the field of active noise control.

In the field of acoustics, the term adaptive noise cancelling has now been adopted to refer specifically to the cancellation of physical noise. In the field of engineering, the term adaptive noise cancelling continues to have a more general meaning, where it can refer to the reduction of interference corrupting a target signal in any medium.
