= Active noise control =

Method for reducing unwanted sound

Graphical depiction of active noise reduction

Active noise control (ANC), also known as noise cancellation (NC), or active noise reduction (ANR), is a method for reducing unwanted sound by the addition of a second sound specifically designed to cancel the first. The concept was first developed in the late 1930s; later developmental work that began in the 1950s eventually resulted in aviation headsets with the technology becoming available in the late 1980s. The technology is also used in road vehicles, mobile telephones, earbuds, and headphones.

== Explanation ==
Sound is a pressure wave, which consists of alternating periods of compression and rarefaction. A noise-cancellation speaker emits a sound wave with the same amplitude but with an inverted phase (also known as antiphase) relative to the original sound. The waves combine to form a new wave, in a process called interference, and effectively cancel each other out – an effect which is called destructive interference.

Modern active noise control is generally achieved through the use of analog circuits or digital signal processing. Adaptive algorithms are designed to analyze the waveform of the background aural or nonaural noise, then, based on the specific algorithm, generate a signal that will either phase shift or invert the polarity of the original signal. This inverted signal (in antiphase) is then amplified and a transducer creates a sound wave directly proportional to the amplitude of the original waveform, creating destructive interference. This effectively reduces the volume of the perceivable noise.

A noise-cancellation speaker may be co-located with the sound source to be attenuated. In this case, it must have the same audio power level as the source of the unwanted sound in order to cancel the noise. Alternatively, the transducer emitting the cancellation signal may be located at the location where sound attenuation is wanted (e.g., the user's ear). This requires a much lower power level for cancellation but is effective only for a single user. Noise cancellation at other locations is more difficult as the three-dimensional wavefronts of the unwanted sound and the cancellation signal could match and create alternating zones of constructive and destructive interference, reducing noise in some spots while doubling noise in others. In small enclosed spaces (e.g., the passenger compartment of a car), global noise reduction can be achieved via multiple speakers and feedback microphones, and measurement of the modal responses of the enclosure.

== History ==
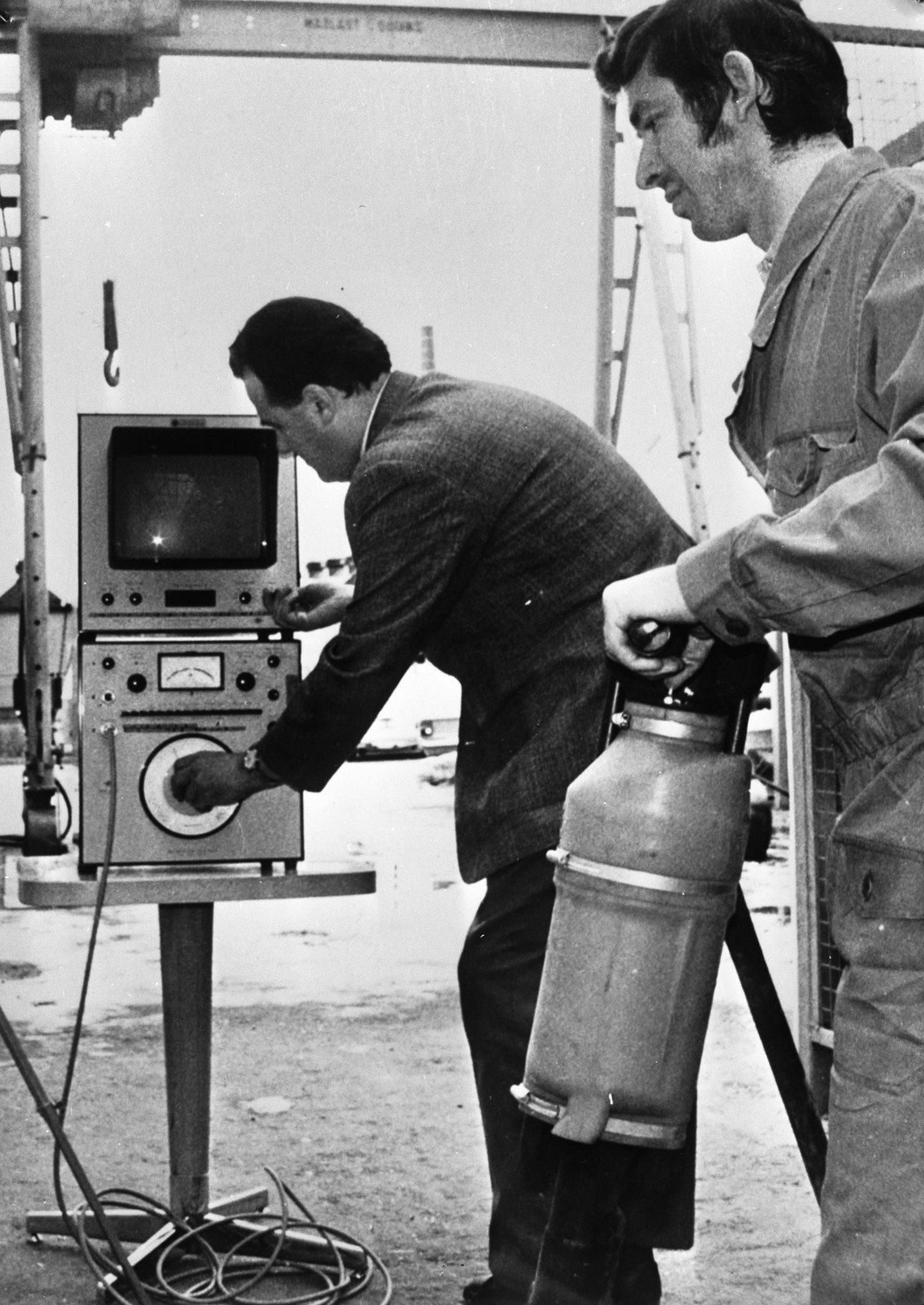
Electronic noise management test in Vienna, 1973

The first patent for a noise control system—U.S. patent 2,043,416—was granted to inventor Paul Lueg in 1936. The patent described how to cancel sinusoidal tones in ducts by phase-advancing the wave and canceling arbitrary sounds in the region around a loudspeaker by inverting the polarity. In the 1950s Lawrence J. Fogel patented systems to cancel the noise in helicopter and airplane cockpits. In 1957, Willard Meeker developed a working model of active noise control applied to a circumaural earmuff. This headset had an active attenuation bandwidth of approximately 50–500 Hz, with a maximum attenuation of approximately 20 dB. By the late 1980s, the first commercially available active noise reduction headsets became available. They could be powered by NiCad batteries or directly from the aircraft power system.

== Applications ==
Applications can be 1-dimensional or 3-dimensional, depending on the type of zone to protect. Periodic sounds, even complex ones, are easier to cancel than random sounds due to the repetition in the waveform.

Protection of a 1-dimension zone is easier and requires only one or two microphones and speakers to be effective. Several commercial applications have been successful: noise-canceling headphones, active mufflers, anti-snoring devices, vocal or center channel extraction for karaoke machines, and the control of noise in air conditioning ducts. In headphones with active noise cancellation, a built-in microphone measures the ambient noise, and the component that would still reach the ear is calculated using the headphones' acoustic transfer function. An opposing signal is then generated in the headphones to compensate for this component. At the eardrum, the external sound and the signal from the headphones combine to form sound. The sound pressure level is significantly reduced. Additionally, desired sound (speech, music) can also be reproduced through the headphones. The term 1-dimension refers to a simple piston-like relationship between the noise and the active speaker (mechanical noise reduction) or between the active speaker and the listener (headphones).

Protection of a 3-dimensional zone requires many microphones and speakers, making it more expensive. Noise reduction is more easily achieved with a single listener remaining stationary but if there are multiple listeners or if the single listener turns their head or moves throughout the space, then the noise reduction challenge is made much more difficult. High-frequency waves are difficult to reduce in three dimensions due to their relatively short audio wavelength in air. The wavelength in air of sinusoidal noise at approximately 800 Hz is double the distance of the average person's left ear to the right ear; such a noise coming directly from the front will be easily reduced by an active system but coming from the side will tend to cancel at one ear while being reinforced at the other, making the noise louder, not softer. (Note: The average head is about 21.5 cm (8.5 in) from ear to ear. Assuming the speed of sound is 343 meters per second (1125 feet per second), the full wavelength of a tone of 1600 Hz reaches from ear to ear. A tone of half that frequency, 800 Hz, has a wavelength twice as long. A single such tone coming from the side will appear at the two ears 180 degrees out of phase—one ear compared to the other. An active noise control tone coming from a different angle will not be able to attenuate the original tone in both ears at once.) High-frequency sounds above 1000 Hz tend to cancel and reinforce unpredictably from many directions. In sum, the most effective noise reduction in three-dimensional space involves low-frequency sounds. Commercial applications of 3-D noise reduction include the protection of aircraft cabins and car interiors, but in these situations, protection is mainly limited to the cancellation of repetitive (or periodic) noise such as engine-, propeller- or rotor-induced noise. This is because an engine's cyclic nature makes analysis and noise cancellation easier to apply.

Modern mobile phones use a multi-microphone design to cancel out ambient noise from the speech signal. Sound is captured from the microphone(s) furthest from the mouth (the noise signal(s)) and from the one closest to the mouth (the desired signal). The signals are processed to cancel the noise from the desired signal, producing improved voice sound quality.

In some cases, noise can be controlled by employing active vibration control. This approach is appropriate when the vibration of a structure produces unwanted noise by coupling the vibration into the surrounding air or water.

== Active versus passive noise control ==
Noise control is an active or passive means of reducing sound emissions, often for personal comfort, environmental considerations, or legal compliance. Active noise control is sound reduction using a power source. Passive noise control is sound reduction by noise-isolating materials such as insulation, sound-absorbing tiles, or a muffler rather than a power source.

Active noise canceling is best suited for low frequencies. For higher frequencies, the spacing requirements for free space and zone of silence techniques become prohibitive. In acoustic cavity and duct-based systems, the number of nodes grows rapidly with increasing frequency, which quickly makes active noise control techniques unmanageable. Passive treatments become more effective at higher frequencies and often provide an adequate solution without the need for active control.

== See also ==
- Active sound design
- Adaptive noise cancelling
- Coherence (physics)
- Noise-canceling microphone
