= List of things named after Norbert Wiener =

In mathematics, there are a large number of topics named in honor of Norbert Wiener (1894 – 1964).

- Abstract Wiener space
- Classical Wiener space
- Paley–Wiener integral
- Paley–Wiener theorem
- Wiener algebra
- Wiener amalgam space
- Wiener chaos expansion
- Wiener criterion
- Wiener deconvolution
- Wiener definition
- Wiener entropy
- Wiener equation
- Wiener filter
  - Generalized Wiener filter
- Wiener's lemma
- Wiener process
  - Generalized Wiener process
- Wiener sausage
- Wiener series
- Wiener–Hopf method
- Wiener–Ikehara theorem
- Wiener–Khinchin theorem
- Wiener–Kolmogorov prediction
- Wiener–Lévy theorem
- Weiner–Rosenblueth model
- Wiener–Wintner theorem
- Wiener's tauberian theorem
