= Wiener's theorem =

Wiener's theorem is any of several theorems named after Norbert Wiener:

- Paley–Wiener theorem
- Wiener's 1/ƒ theorem about functions with absolutely convergent Fourier series.
- Wiener–Ikehara theorem
- Wiener–Khinchin theorem
- Wiener's tauberian theorem
- Wiener–Wintner theorem

See also

- Wiener's lemma
