= Ladder height process =

In probability theory, the ladder height process is a record of the largest or smallest value a given stochastic process has achieved up to the specified point in time.

The Wiener-Hopf factorization gives the transition probability kernel in the discrete time case.

== See also ==
- Record value
