= Ikehara =

Ikehara (written: 池原) is a Japanese surname mainly found in Okinawa. Notable people with the surname include:

- Ayaka Ikehara (born 1990), Japanese handball player
- Shikao Ikehara (池原 止戈夫, 1904–1984), Japanese mathematician
