= Wiener–Lévy theorem =

Theorem about convergence of Fourier series

Wiener–Lévy theorem is a theorem in Fourier analysis, which states that a function of an absolutely convergent Fourier series has an absolutely convergent Fourier series under some conditions. The theorem was named after Norbert Wiener and Paul Lévy.

Norbert Wiener first proved Wiener's 1/f theorem, see Wiener's theorem. It states that if f has absolutely convergent Fourier series and is never zero, then its inverse 1/f also has an absolutely convergent Fourier series.

== Wiener–Levy theorem ==
Paul Levy generalized Wiener's result, showing that

Let $F(\theta ) = \sum\limits_{k = -\infty}^\infty c_k e^{ik\theta}, \quad\theta \in [0,2\pi ]$ be an absolutely convergent Fourier series with

$$\|F\| = \sum\limits_{k = -\infty}^\infty |c_k| < \infty.$$

The values of $F(\theta )$ lie on a curve $C$, and $H(t)$ is an analytic (not necessarily single-valued) function of a complex variable which is regular at every point of $C$. Then $H[F(\theta )]$ has an absolutely convergent Fourier series.

The proof can be found in the Zygmund's classic book Trigonometric Series.

== Example ==
Let $H(\theta )=\ln(\theta )$ and $F(\theta ) = \sum\limits_{k = 0}^\infty p_k e^{ik\theta},(\sum\limits_{k = 0}^\infty p_k = 1$) is characteristic function of discrete probability distribution. So $F(\theta )$ is an absolutely convergent Fourier series. If $F(\theta )$ has no zeros, then we have

$$H[F(\theta )] = \ln \left( \sum\limits_{k = 0}^\infty  p_k e^{ik\theta} \right) = \sum_{k = 0}^\infty c_k e^{ik\theta},$$

where $\|H\| = \sum\limits_{k = 0}^\infty |c_k| < \infty.$

The statistical application of this example can be found in discrete pseudo compound Poisson distribution and zero-inflated model.

If a discrete r.v. 
  
    
      
        X
      
    
    {\displaystyle X}
  
 with 
  
    
      
        Pr
        (
        X
        =
        i
        )
        =
        
          P
          
            i
          
        
      
    
    {\displaystyle \Pr(X=i)=P_{i}}
  
, 
  
    
      
        i
        ∈
        
          N
        
      
    
    {\displaystyle i\in \mathbb {N} }
  
, has the probability generating function of the form

$$P(z) = \sum\limits_{i = 0}^\infty  P_{i} z^{i} = \exp \left\{\sum\limits_{i = 1}^{\infty} \alpha_{i} \lambda (z^{i} - 1) \right\},z=e^{ik\theta}$$

where $\sum\limits_{i = 1}^{\infty} \alpha_{i} = 1$, $\sum \limits_{i = 1}^{\infty} \left| \alpha_{i} \right| < \infty$, $\alpha_{i} \in \mathbb{R}$, and $\lambda > 0$. Then $X$ is said to have the discrete pseudo compound Poisson distribution, abbreviated DPCP.

We denote it as $X \sim DPCP({\alpha _1}\lambda,{\alpha _2}\lambda, \cdots )$.

== See also ==
- Wiener's theorem (disambiguation)
