= Record value =

In statistics, a record value or record statistic is the largest or smallest value obtained from a sequence of random variables. The theory is closely related to that used in order statistics.

The term was first introduced by K. N. Chandler in 1952.

== See also ==
- Ladder height process
- MinHash
