= God & Golem, Inc. =

Book by Norbert Wiener

God & Golem, Inc.: A Comment on Certain Points Where Cybernetics Impinges on Religion
- 1st edition cover
- Author: Norbert Wiener
- Language: English
- Publisher: MIT Press
- Publication date: 1964
- Publication place: United States

God & Golem, Inc.: A Comment on Certain Points Where Cybernetics Impinges on Religion is a book written by MIT cybernetician Norbert Wiener. It won the second annual U.S. National Book Award in category Science, Philosophy and Religion.

It is based on material from a series of lectures that Wiener gave at Yale in 1962, and a seminar he led at the Colloques Philosophiques Internationaux de Royaumont near Paris later that year.

God and Golem presents Wiener's ideas on machine learning, machine reproduction, and the place of machines in society, with some religious context.

Wiener mentions some of his secondary concerns: sensory feedback in artificial limbs, the problems of human responsibility in relation with technology, the limits of machine game-playing, Darwinism, Marxism, the Cold War, the rigidity of ideological thinking, and a critique of the claims of econometrics and mathematical economics to be regarded as being scientific.

In the conclusion, he brings the burden of ethics to politics, away from religion.

Statements in the book are quoted in the science-fiction novels Hyperion and The Fall of Hyperion, written by Dan Simmons.
