= Wiener–Ikehara theorem =

Tauberian theorem introduced by Shikao Ikehara (1931)

The Wiener–Ikehara theorem is a Tauberian theorem, originally published by Shikao Ikehara, a student of Norbert Wiener's, in 1931. It is a special case of Wiener's Tauberian theorems, which were published by Wiener one year later. It can be used to prove the prime number theorem (Chandrasekharan, 1969), under the assumption that the Riemann zeta function has no zeros on the line of real part one.

== Statement ==
Let A(x) be a non-negative, monotonic nondecreasing function of x, defined for 0 ≤ x < ∞. Suppose that

$$f(s)=\int_0^\infty A(x) e^{-xs}\,dx$$

converges for ℜ(s) > 1 to the function ƒ(s) and that, for some non-negative number c,

$$f(s) - \frac{c}{s-1}$$

has an extension as a continuous function for ℜ(s) ≥ 1. Then the limit as x goes to infinity of e^{−x} A(x) is equal to c.

== One Particular Application ==
An important number-theoretic application of the theorem is to Dirichlet series of the form

$$\sum_{n=1}^\infty a(n) n^{-s}$$

where a(n) is non-negative. If the series converges to an analytic function in

$$\Re(s) \ge b$$

with a simple pole of residue c at s = b, then

$$\sum_{n\le X}a(n) \sim \frac{c}{b} X^b.$$

Applying this to the logarithmic derivative of the Riemann zeta function, where the coefficients in the Dirichlet series are values of the von Mangoldt function, it is possible to deduce the Prime number theorem from the fact that the zeta function has no zeroes on the line

$$\Re(s)=1.$$
