= Wiener–Hopf method =

Mathematical method for integrodifferential equations

The Wiener–Hopf method is a mathematical technique widely used in applied mathematics. It was initially developed by Norbert Wiener and Eberhard Hopf as a method to solve systems of integral equations, but has found wider use in solving two-dimensional partial differential equations with mixed boundary conditions on the same boundary. In general, the method works by exploiting the complex-analytical properties of transformed functions. Typically, the standard Fourier transform is used, but examples exist using other transforms, such as the Mellin transform.

In general, the governing equations and boundary conditions are transformed and these transforms are used to define a pair of complex functions (typically denoted with '+' and '−' subscripts) which are respectively analytic in the upper and lower halves of the complex plane, and have growth no faster than polynomials in these regions. These two functions will also coincide on some region of the complex plane, typically, a thin strip containing the real line. Analytic continuation guarantees that these two functions define a single function analytic in the entire complex plane, and Liouville's theorem implies that this function is an unknown polynomial, which is often zero or constant. Analysis of the conditions at the edges and corners of the boundary allows one to determine the degree of this polynomial.

== Wiener–Hopf decomposition ==
The fundamental equation that appears in the Wiener-Hopf method is of the form

$$A(\alpha)\Xi_+(\alpha) + B(\alpha)\Psi_-(\alpha) + C(\alpha) =0,$$

where $A$, $B$, $C$ are known holomorphic functions, the functions $\Xi_+(\alpha)$, $\Psi_-(\alpha)$ are unknown and the equation holds in a strip $\tau_- < \mathfrak{Im}(\alpha) < \tau_+$ in the complex $\alpha$ plane. Finding $\Xi_+(\alpha)$, $\Psi_-(\alpha)$ is what's called the Wiener-Hopf problem.

The key step in many Wiener–Hopf problems is to decompose an arbitrary function $\Phi$ into two functions $\Phi_{\pm}$ with the desired properties outlined above. In general, this can be done by writing

$$\Phi_+(\alpha) = \frac{1}{2\pi i} \int_{C_1} \Phi(z) \frac{dz}{z-\alpha}$$

and

$$\Phi_-(\alpha) = - \frac{1}{2\pi i} \int_{C_2} \Phi(z) \frac{dz}{z-\alpha},$$

where the contours $C_1$ and $C_2$ are parallel to the real line, but pass above and below the point $z=\alpha$, respectively.

Similarly, arbitrary scalar functions may be decomposed into a product of +/− functions, i.e. $K(\alpha) = K_+(\alpha)K_-(\alpha)$, by first taking the logarithm, and then performing a sum decomposition. Product decompositions of matrix functions (which occur in coupled multi-modal systems such as elastic waves) are considerably more problematic since the logarithm is not well defined, and any decomposition might be expected to be non-commutative. A small subclass of commutative decompositions were obtained by Khrapkov, and various approximate methods have also been developed.

== Example ==
Consider the linear partial differential equation

$$\boldsymbol{L}_{xy}f(x,y)=0,$$

where $\boldsymbol{L}_{xy}$ is a linear operator which contains derivatives with respect to x and y, subject to the mixed conditions on y = 0, for some prescribed function g(x),

$$f=g(x)\text{ for }x\leq 0, \quad f_y=0\text{ when }x>0$$

and decay at infinity i.e. f → 0 as $\boldsymbol{x}\rightarrow \infty$.

Taking a Fourier transform with respect to x results in the following ordinary differential equation

$$\boldsymbol{L}_y \widehat{f}(k,y)-P(k,y)\widehat{f}(k,y)=0,$$

where $\boldsymbol{L}_{y}$ is a linear operator containing y derivatives only, P(k,y) is a known function of y and k and

$$\widehat{f}(k,y)=\int_{-\infty}^\infty f(x,y)e^{-ikx} \, \textrm{d}x.$$

If a particular solution of this ordinary differential equation which satisfies the necessary decay at infinity is denoted F(k,y), a general solution can be written as

$$\widehat{f}(k,y)=C(k)F(k,y),$$

where C(k) is an unknown function to be determined by the boundary conditions on y=0.

The key idea is to split $\widehat{f}$ into two separate functions, $\widehat{f}_{+}$ and $\widehat{f}_{-}$ which are analytic in the lower- and upper-halves of the complex plane, respectively,

$$\widehat{f}_{+}(k,y)=\int_0^\infty f(x,y)e^{-ikx}\,\textrm{d}x,$$
$$\widehat{f}_{-}(k,y)=\int_{-\infty}^0 f(x,y)e^{-ikx}\,\textrm{d}x.$$

The boundary conditions then give

$$\widehat{g\,}(k)+\widehat{f}_{+}(k,0) = \widehat{f}_{-}(k,0)+\widehat{f}_{+}(k,0) = \widehat{f}(k,0) = C(k)F(k,0)$$

and, on taking derivatives with respect to $y$,

$$\widehat{f}'_{-}(k,0) = \widehat{f}'_{-}(k,0)+\widehat{f}'_{+}(k,0) = \widehat{f}'(k,0) = C(k)F'(k,0).$$

Eliminating $C(k)$ yields

$$\widehat{g\,}(k)+\widehat{f}_{+}(k,0) = \widehat{f}'_{-}(k,0)/K(k),$$

where

$$K(k)=\frac{F'(k,0)}{F(k,0)}.$$

Now $K(k)$ can be decomposed into the product of functions $K^{-}$ and $K^{+}$ which are analytic in the upper and lower half-planes respectively.

To be precise, $K(k)=K^{+}(k)K^{-}(k),$ where

$$\log K^{-} = \frac{1}{2\pi i}\int_{-\infty}^\infty \frac{\log(K(z))}{z-k} \,\textrm{d}z, \quad \operatorname{Im}k>0,$$
$$\log K^{+} = -\frac{1}{2\pi i}\int_{-\infty}^\infty \frac{\log(K(z))}{z-k} \,\textrm{d}z, \quad \operatorname{Im}k<0.$$

(Note that this sometimes involves scaling $K$ so that it tends to $1$ as $k\rightarrow\infty$.) We also decompose $K^{+}\widehat{g\,}$ into the sum of two functions $G^{+}$ and $G^{-}$ which are analytic in the lower and upper half-planes respectively, i.e.,

$$K^{+}(k)\widehat{g\,}(k)=G^{+}(k)+G^{-}(k).$$

This can be done in the same way that we factorised $K(k).$ Consequently,

$$G^{+}(k) + K_{+}(k)\widehat{f}_{+}(k,0) = \widehat{f}'_{-}(k,0)/K_{-}(k) - G^{-}(k).$$

Now, as the left-hand side of the above equation is analytic in the lower half-plane, whilst the right-hand side is analytic in the upper half-plane, analytic continuation guarantees existence of an entire function which coincides with the left- or right-hand sides in their respective half-planes. Furthermore, since it can be shown that the functions on either side of the above equation decay at large k, an application of Liouville's theorem shows that this entire function is identically zero, therefore

$$\widehat{f}_{+}(k,0) = -\frac{G^{+}(k)}{K^{+}(k)},$$

and so

$$C(k) = \frac{K^{+}(k)\widehat{g\,}(k)-G^{+}(k)}{K^{+}(k)F(k,0)}.$$

== See also ==
- Wiener filter
- Riemann–Hilbert problem
