= Wiener equation =

Mathematical representation of Brownian motion

A simple mathematical representation of Brownian motion, the Wiener equation, named after Norbert Wiener, assumes the current velocity of a fluid particle fluctuates randomly:

$$\mathbf{v} = \frac{d\mathbf{x}}{dt} = g(t),$$

where v is velocity, x is position, d/dt is the time derivative, and g(t) may for instance be white noise.

Since velocity changes instantly in this formalism, the Wiener equation is not suitable for short time scales. In those cases, the Langevin equation, which looks at particle acceleration, must be used.
