= Generalized Wiener process =

In statistics, a continuous time random walk

In statistics, a generalized Wiener process (named after Norbert Wiener) is a continuous time random walk with drift and random jumps at every point in time. Formally:

$$a(x,t) dt + b(x,t) \eta \sqrt{dt}$$

where a and b are deterministic functions, t is a continuous index for time, x is a set of exogenous variables that may change with time, dt is a differential in time, and η is a random draw from a standard normal distribution at each instant.

== See also ==
- Wiener process
