= Shikao Ikehara =

Japanese mathematician

Shikao Ikehara (池原 止戈夫, Ikehara Shikao; April 11, 1904 – October 10, 1984) was a Japanese mathematician. He was a student of Norbert Wiener at MIT (PhD 1930).

== Career ==
Following Wiener in 1928, in 1931 Ikehara used Wiener's Tauberian theory to derive another proof of the prime number theorem, demonstrated solely via the non-vanishing of the zeta function on the line Re s = 1. An improved version of Ikehara's 1931 result by Wiener in 1932 is now known as the Wiener–Ikehara theorem.

Proofs of the prime number theorem before 1928 and only using the behaviour of the zeta function on the line Re s = 1 (as the 1908 proof of Edmund Landau), also appealed to some bound on the order of growth of the zeta function on this line.

Returning to Japan after studying with Dr Wiener, he taught at Osaka University and the Tokyo Institute of Technology. He translated Cybernetics: Or Control and Communication in the Animal and Machine into Japanese.
