= Wiener's Tauberian theorem =

In mathematical analysis, Wiener's Tauberian theorem is any of several related results proved by Norbert Wiener in 1932. They provide a necessary and sufficient condition under which any function in $L^1$ or $L^2$ can be approximated by linear combinations of translations of a given function.

Informally, if the Fourier transform of a function $f$ vanishes on a certain set $Z$, the Fourier transform of any linear combination of translations of $f$ also vanishes on $Z$. Therefore, the linear combinations of translations of $f$ cannot approximate a function whose Fourier transform does not vanish on $Z$.

Wiener's theorems make this precise, stating that linear combinations of translations of $f$ are dense if and only if the zero set of the Fourier transform of $f$ is empty (in the case of $L^1$) or of Lebesgue measure zero (in the case of $L^2$).

Gelfand reformulated Wiener's theorem in terms of commutative C*-algebras, when it states that the spectrum of the $L^1$ group ring $L^1(\mathbb{R})$ of the group $\mathbb{R}$ of real numbers is the dual group of $\mathbb{R}$. A similar result is true when $\mathbb{R}$ is replaced by any locally compact abelian group.

== Introduction ==
A typical Tauberian theorem is the following result, for $f\in L^1(0,\infty)$. If:

1. $f(x)=O(1)$ as $x\to\infty$
2. $\frac1x\int_0^\infty e^{-t/x}f(t)\,dt \to L$ as $x\to\infty$,

then

$$\frac1x\int_0^xf(t)\,dt \to L.$$

Generalizing, let $G(t)$ be a given function, and $P_G(f)$ be the proposition

$$\frac1x\int_0^\infty G(t/x)f(t)\,dt \to L.$$

Note that one of the hypotheses and the conclusion of the Tauberian theorem has the form $P_G(f)$, respectively, with $G(t)=e^{-t}$ and $G(t)=1_{[0,1]}(t).$ The second hypothesis is a "Tauberian condition".

Wiener's Tauberian theorems have the following structure:

If $G_1$ is a given function such that $W(G_1)$, $P_{G_1}(f)$, and $R(f)$, then $P_{G_2}(f)$ holds for all "reasonable" $G_2$.

Here $R(f)$ is a "Tauberian" condition on $f$, and $W(G_1)$ is a special condition on the kernel $G_1$. The power of the theorem is that $P_{G_2}(f)$ holds, not for a particular kernel $G_2$, but for all reasonable kernels $G_2$.

The Wiener condition is roughly a condition on the zeros the Fourier transform of $G_2$. For instance, for functions of class $L^1$, the condition is that the Fourier transform does not vanish anywhere. This condition is often easily seen to be a necessary condition for a Tauberian theorem of this kind to hold. The key point is that this easy necessary condition is also sufficient.

== The condition in L^{1} ==
Let $f\in L^1(\mathbb{R})$ be an integrable function. The span of translations $f_a(x) = f(x+a)$ is dense in $L^1(\mathbb{R})$ if and only if the Fourier transform of $f$ has no real zeros.

=== Tauberian reformulation ===
The following statement is equivalent to the previous result, and explains why Wiener's result is a Tauberian theorem:

Suppose the Fourier transform of $f\in L^1$ has no real zeros, and suppose the convolution $f*h$ tends to zero at infinity for some $h\in L^\infty$. Then the convolution $g*h$ tends to zero at infinity for any $g\in L^1$.

More generally, if

$$\lim_{x \to \infty} (f*h)(x) = A \int f(x) \,dx$$

for some $f\in L^1$ the Fourier transform of which has no real zeros, then also

$$\lim_{x \to \infty} (g*h)(x) = A \int g(x) \,dx$$

for any $g\in L^1$.

=== Discrete version ===
Wiener's theorem has a counterpart in $l^1(\mathbb{Z})$: the span of the translations of $f\in l^1(\mathbb{Z})$ is dense if and only if the Fourier transform

$$\varphi(\theta) = \sum_{n \in \mathbb{Z}} f(n) e^{-in\theta} \,$$

has no real zeros. The following statements are equivalent version of this result:

- Suppose the Fourier transform of $f\in l^1(\mathbb{Z})$ has no real zeros, and for some bounded sequence $h$ the convolution $f*h$

tends to zero at infinity. Then $g*h$ also tends to zero at infinity for any $g\in l^1(\mathbb{Z})$.

- Let $\varphi$ be a function on the unit circle with absolutely convergent Fourier series. Then $1/\varphi$ has absolutely convergent Fourier series

if and only if $\varphi$ has no zeros.

Gelfand (1941a, 1941b) showed that this is equivalent to the following property of the Wiener algebra $A(\mathbb{T})$, which he proved using the theory of Banach algebras, thereby giving a new proof of Wiener's result:

- The maximal ideals of $A(\mathbb{T})$ are all of the form

$$M_x = \left\{ f \in A(\mathbb{T}) \mid f(x) = 0 \right\}, \quad x \in \mathbb{T}.$$

== The condition in L^{2} ==
Let $f\in L^2(\mathbb{R})$ be a square-integrable function. The span of translations $f_a(x) = f(x+a)$ is dense in $L^2(\mathbb{R})$ if and only if the real zeros of the Fourier transform of $f$ form a set of zero Lebesgue measure.

The parallel statement in $l^2(\mathbb{Z})$ is as follows: the span of translations of a sequence $f\in l^2(\mathbb{Z})$ is dense if and only if the zero set of the Fourier transform

$$\varphi(\theta) = \sum_{n \in \mathbb{Z}} f(n) e^{-in\theta}$$

has zero Lebesgue measure.
