= Wiener algebra =

In mathematics, the Wiener algebra, named after Norbert Wiener and usually denoted by A(T), is the space of absolutely convergent Fourier series. Here T denotes the circle group.

== Banach algebra structure ==
The norm of a function f ∈ A(T) is given by

$$\|f\|=\sum_{n=-\infty}^\infty |\hat{f}(n)|,\,$$

where

$$\hat{f}(n)= \frac{1}{2\pi}\int_{-\pi}^\pi f(t)e^{-int} \, dt$$

is the nth Fourier coefficient of f. The Wiener algebra A(T) is closed under pointwise multiplication of functions. Indeed,

$$\begin{align}
f(t)g(t) & = \sum_{m\in\mathbb{Z}} \hat{f}(m)e^{imt}\,\cdot\,\sum_{n\in\mathbb{Z}} \hat{g}(n)e^{int} \\
& = \sum_{n,m\in\mathbb{Z}} \hat{f}(m)\hat{g}(n)e^{i(m+n)t} \\
& = \sum_{n\in\mathbb{Z}} \left\{ \sum_{m \in \mathbb{Z}} \hat{f}(n-m)\hat{g}(m) \right\}e^{int}
,\qquad f,g\in A(\mathbb{T});
\end{align}$$

therefore

$$\|f g\|
= \sum_{n\in\mathbb{Z}} \left| \sum_{m \in \mathbb{Z}} \hat{f}(n-m)\hat{g}(m) \right|
\leq \sum_{m} |\hat{f}(m)| \sum_n |\hat{g}(n)| = \|f\| \, \|g\|.\,$$

Thus the Wiener algebra is a commutative unitary Banach algebra. Also, A(T) is isomorphic to the Banach algebra l_{1}(Z), with the isomorphism given by the Fourier transform.

== Properties ==
The sum of an absolutely convergent Fourier series is continuous, so

$$A(\mathbb{T})\subset C(\mathbb{T})$$

where C(T) is the ring of continuous functions on the unit circle.

On the other hand an integration by parts, together with the Cauchy–Schwarz inequality and Parseval's formula, shows that

$$C^1(\mathbb{T})\subset A(\mathbb{T}).\,$$

More generally,

$$\mathrm{Lip}_\alpha(\mathbb{T})\subset A(\mathbb{T})\subset C(\mathbb{T})$$

for $\alpha>1/2$ (see Katznelson (2004)).

== Wiener's 1/f theorem ==
Wiener (1932, 1933) proved that if f has absolutely convergent Fourier series and is never zero, then its reciprocal 1/f also has an absolutely convergent Fourier series. Many other proofs have appeared since then, including an elementary one by Newman (1975).

Gelfand (1941, 1941b) used the theory of Banach algebras that he developed to show that the maximal ideals of A(T) are of the form

$$M_x = \left\{ f \in A(\mathbb{T}) \, \mid \, f(x) = 0 \right\}, \quad x \in \mathbb{T}~,$$

which is equivalent to Wiener's theorem.

== See also ==
- Wiener–Lévy theorem
