= Norbert Wiener =

American mathematician and philosopher (1894–1964)

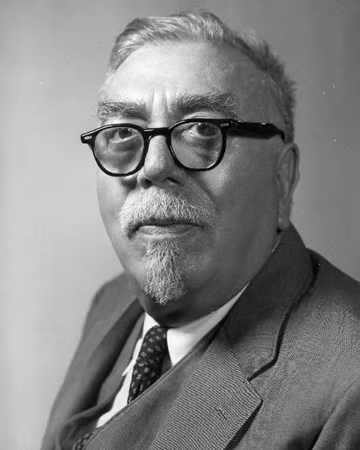
- Born: November 26, 1894; Columbia, Missouri, U.S.
- Died: March 18, 1964 (aged 69); Stockholm, Sweden
- Education: Tufts College (BA); Cornell University (MA); Harvard University (PhD)
- Known for: Cybernetics Brownian motion abstract Wiener space Wiener amalgam space classical Wiener space Evolutionary informatics Generalized Wiener process Information revolution Philosophy of information More: List of things named after Norbert Wiener
- Spouse: Margaret Engemann (m. 1926)
- Children: 2
- Awards: Bôcher Memorial Prize (1933); National Medal of Science (1963)
- Scientific career
- Fields: Mathematics; Cybernetics; Computer science
- Workplaces: Massachusetts Institute of Technology
- Thesis: A Comparison Between the Treatment of the Algebra of Relatives by Schroeder and that by Whitehead and Russell (1913)
- Doctoral advisors: Karl Schmidt
- Other academic advisors: Josiah Royce
- Doctoral students: Amar Bose; Colin Cherry; Shikao Ikehara; Yuk-Wing Lee; Norman Levinson; Dorothy Walcott Weeks; George Zames; John P. Costas

Norbert Wiener (November 26, 1894 – March 18, 1964) was an American computer scientist, mathematician, and philosopher. He became a professor of mathematics at the Massachusetts Institute of Technology (MIT). A child prodigy, Wiener later became an early researcher in stochastic and mathematical noise processes, contributing work relevant to electronic engineering, electronic communication, and control systems.

Wiener is considered the originator of cybernetics, the science of communication as it relates to living things and machines, with implications for engineering, systems control, computer science, biology, neuroscience, philosophy, and the organization of society. His work heavily influenced computer pioneer John von Neumann, information theorist Claude Shannon, anthropologists Margaret Mead and Gregory Bateson, and others.

Wiener is credited as being one of the first to theorize that all intelligent behavior was the result of feedback mechanisms that could possibly be simulated by machines, an important early step towards the development of modern artificial intelligence.

== Biography ==
=== Family and youth ===
Wiener was born in Columbia, Missouri, the first child of Leo Wiener and Bertha Kahn, Jewish immigrants from Lithuania and Germany, respectively. Through his father, he was related to Maimonides, the famous 12th century rabbi, philosopher and physician from al-Andalus, as well as to Akiva Eger, chief rabbi of Posen from 1815 to 1837.

He met his paternal grandfather—Solomon Wiener, whom he describes as a scholarly journalist incapable of keeping the family together—only once in New York. Despite this, he was impressed by his grandfather's efforts to replace Yiddish in his lived environment with German. Solomon was born in Krotoschin, but married his wife—who came from a family of Jewish tanners—before settling in Byelostok where Wiener's father was born in 1862. Wiener was told they had originally been minor nobles in Russia, such that when the Russian Tzar came to visit Byelostok it was his grandmother's house which was selected as a place of temporary residence.

His paternal grandmother's side of the family was very different to his grandfather's side, and Wiener suggests that his father developed "solid, business-like habits that gave my father a firm footing in life", which made him a better custodian of the family than his grandfather. Nonetheless, his father still displayed an idealist streak. By the age of thirteen and because of their family situation—and because according to Wiener there is a tendency within the Jewish community to give adolescent boys the responsibilities of men—his father Leo had begun to support his family as a private tutor. Due to the German bias of his grandfather, Wiener's father went to a Lutheran school and learnt several languages.

His father later left the Minsk Gymnasium for Warsaw in Poland, where Wiener claims his father developed good relations with his Polish schoolmates—so much so that his father became privy to the underground Polish resistance movement. His father became a contemporary of Zamenhof, the inventor of Esperanto, to which Wiener claims: "my father was one of the first to study the new artificial language". His father later went to the University of Warsaw to study medicine, although could not handle the profession so went to study at the Polytechnicum in Berlin to study engineering. Relatives in Berlin with connections to Mendelssohn bank tried to get his father to pursue a career in banking, but his father declined. Instead, his father had begun to develop a Tolstoyan ethic which was reinforced through his attendance of a humanitarian student meeting, which would eventually led to him emigrating to the United States, as well as Wiener's vegetarianism. Wiener, however, expressed resentment over his father's dogmatism over this later point during his childhood, which in his view led to emotional abuse from his father.

However, assuming for the sake of argument that all these events had occurred in their due sequence, I should still not have been brought up as a vegetarian, should not have lived in a house in which I was surrounded by horrible and hair raising vegetarian tracts concerning cruelty to animals, and should not have been subjected to the overwhelming precept and example of my father in such matters.

His father planned to set up a commune in Central America based on these ideas. However, his companion abandoned him, leaving him on a ship to Hartlepool. His father then went to Liverpool, Havana and New Orleans—picking up both on English and Spanish during his trip. Eventually, his father decided to teach languages and went into Philology. He later met Wiener's mother Bertha Kahn, the daughter of department store owner Henry Kahn, in St. Joseph, Missouri.

His maternal grandfather was a German Jewish immigrant from Rhineland. His wife, whose maiden name was Ellinger, had settled in the United States a few generations beforehand. He notes that his maternal grandmother's mother was not Jewish, and suggests that while women in that side of the family tended to marry inside the Jewish community, men from that side of the family tended to marry Gentiles. The family could also trace its roots to the American South. He notes that many men from this side of the family tended to leave some "career of impeccable propriety by suddenly leaving his family and taking to the great open spaces", with rumours that one family member ended up becoming a Western bandit and was shot trying to evade capture. In his autobiography, Wiener contrasted the melting pot culture that he was brought up in with the more socially homogeneous Old American culture that had been predominant before. He saw this culture as offering greater freedom and opportunity compared to the serfdom that was found for many in Eastern Europe.

He writes of his youth: "Child as I was, I absorbed a real understanding of many things, and my childish point of view is not totally devoid of significance". Leo had educated Norbert at home until 1903, employing teaching methods of his own invention, except for a brief interlude when Norbert was seven years of age. Earning his living teaching German and Slavic languages, Leo read widely and accumulated a personal library from which the young Norbert benefited greatly. Leo also had ample ability in mathematics and tutored his son in the subject until he left home. In his autobiography, Norbert described his father as calm and patient, unless he (Norbert) failed to give a correct answer, at which his father would lose his temper.

In "The Theory of Ignorance", a paper Wiener wrote at the age of 10, he disputed "man's presumption in declaring that his knowledge has no limits", arguing that all human knowledge "is based on an approximation", and acknowledging "the impossibility of being certain of anything."

Wiener graduated from Ayer High School in 1906 at age 11, at which point he entered Tufts College, being awarded a BA in mathematics in 1909 at the age of 14. He began graduate studies of zoology at Harvard, before transferring to Cornell in 1910 to study philosophy. He graduated in 1911 at 17 years of age.

=== Harvard and World War I ===
The next year, he returned to Harvard, while still continuing his philosophical studies. Back at Harvard, Wiener became influenced by Edward Vermilye Huntington, whose mathematical interests ranged from axiomatic foundations to engineering problems. Harvard awarded Wiener a PhD in June 1913, when he was only 18 years old, for a dissertation on mathematical logic (a comparison of the work of Ernst Schröder with that of Alfred North Whitehead and Bertrand Russell), supervised by Karl Schmidt, the essential results of which were published as Wiener (1914). He was one of the youngest to achieve such a feat. In that dissertation, he was the first to state publicly that ordered pairs can be defined in terms of elementary set theory. Hence relations can be defined by set theory, thus the theory of relations does not require any axioms or primitive notions distinct from those of set theory. In 1921, Kazimierz Kuratowski proposed a simplification of Wiener's definition of ordered pairs, and that simplification has been in common use ever since. It is $\ \left( x, y \right) = \bigl\{ \left\{ x \right\}, \left\{x, y \right\}\ \bigr\} ~.$

In 1914, Wiener traveled to Europe, to be taught by Bertrand Russell and G. H. Hardy at Cambridge University, and by David Hilbert and Edmund Landau at the University of Göttingen. At Göttingen he also attended three courses with Edmund Husserl "one on Kant's ethical writings, one on the principles of Ethics, and the seminar on Phenomenology." (Letter to Russell, c. June or July, 1914). During 1915–1916, he taught philosophy at Harvard, then was an engineer for General Electric and wrote for the Encyclopedia Americana. Wiener was briefly a journalist for the Boston Herald, where he wrote a feature story on the poor labor conditions for mill workers in Lawrence, Massachusetts, but he was fired soon afterwards for his reluctance to write favorable articles about a politician the newspaper's owners sought to promote.

Although Wiener eventually became a staunch pacifist, he eagerly contributed to the war effort in World War I. In 1916, with America's entry into the war drawing closer, Wiener attended a training camp for potential military officers but failed to earn a commission. One year later Wiener again tried to join the military, but the government again rejected him due to his poor eyesight. In the summer of 1918, Oswald Veblen invited Wiener to work on ballistics at the Aberdeen Proving Ground in Maryland. Living and working with other mathematicians strengthened his interest in mathematics. However, Wiener was still eager to serve in uniform and decided to make one more attempt to enlist, this time as a common soldier. Wiener wrote in a letter to his parents, "I should consider myself a pretty cheap kind of a swine if I were willing to be an officer but unwilling to be a soldier." This time the army accepted Wiener into its ranks and assigned him, by coincidence, to a unit stationed at Aberdeen, Maryland. World War I ended just days after Wiener's return to Aberdeen and Wiener was discharged from the military in February 1919.

=== After the war ===
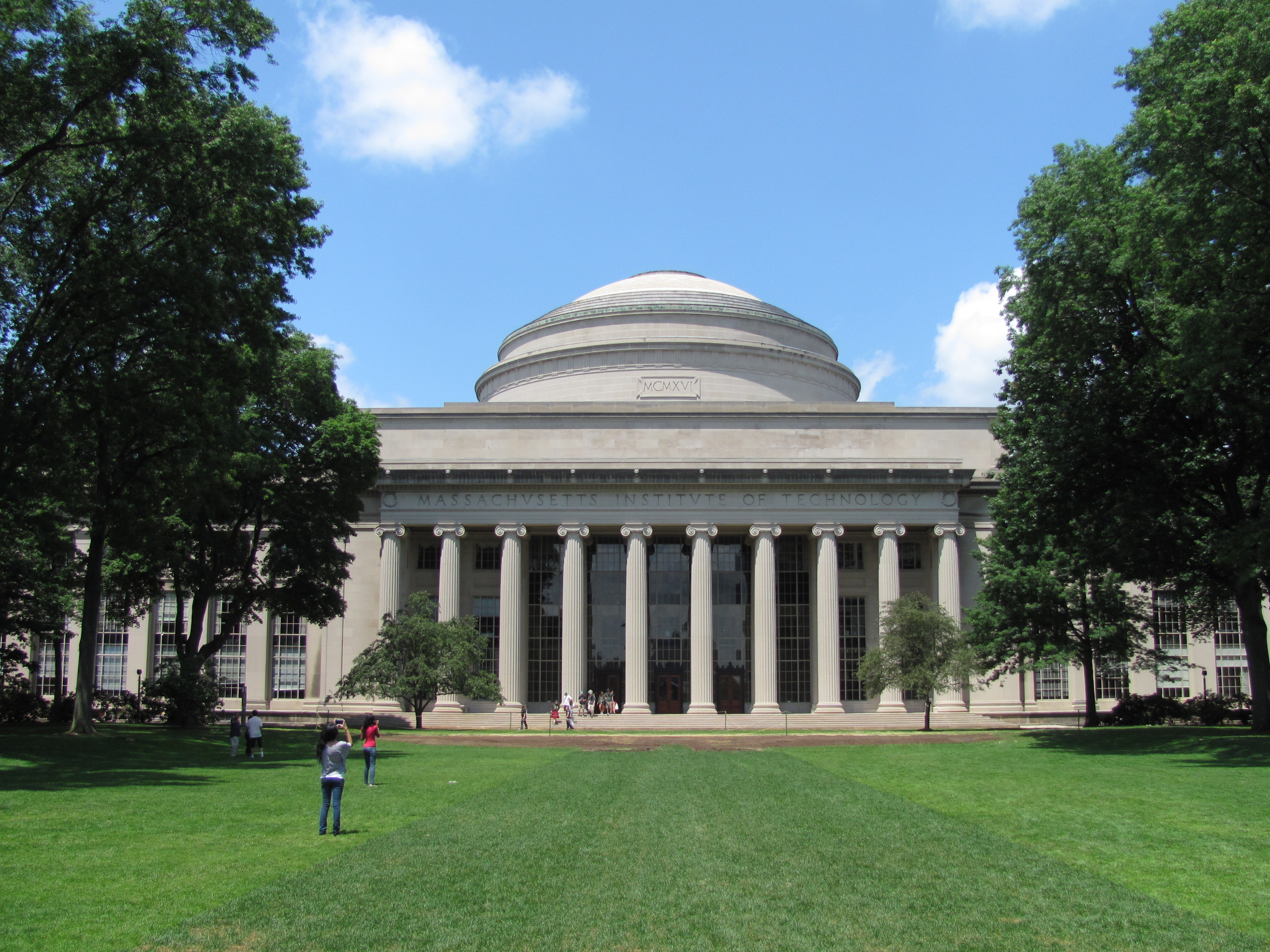
Wiener was regarded as a semi-legendary figure at MIT.

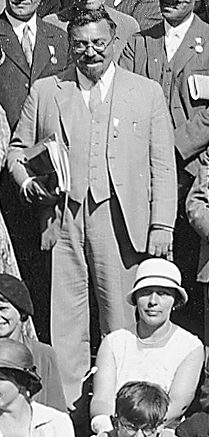
Norbert (standing) and Margaret Wiener (sitting) at the International Congress of Mathematicians, Zurich, 1932

Wiener was unable to secure a permanent position at Harvard, a situation he attributed largely to anti-Semitism at the university and in particular the antipathy of Harvard mathematician G. D. Birkhoff. He was also rejected for a position at the University of Melbourne. At W. F. Osgood's suggestion, Wiener was hired as an instructor of mathematics at MIT, where, after his promotion to professor, he spent the remainder of his career. For many years his photograph was prominently displayed in the Infinite Corridor and often used in giving directions, but by 2017 it had been removed.

In 1926, Wiener returned to Europe as a Guggenheim scholar. He spent most of his time at Göttingen and with Hardy at Cambridge, working on Brownian motion, the Fourier integral, Dirichlet's problem, harmonic analysis, and the Tauberian theorems.

In 1926, Wiener's parents arranged his marriage to a German immigrant, Margaret Engemann; they had two daughters. His sister, Constance (1898–1973), married mathematician Philip Franklin. Their daughter, Janet, Wiener's niece, married mathematician Václav E. Beneš. Wiener's sister Bertha (1902–1995) married the botanist Carroll William Dodge.

Many tales, perhaps apocryphal, were told of Norbert Wiener at MIT, especially concerning his absent-mindedness. It was said that he returned home once to find his house empty. He inquired of a neighborhood girl the reason, and she said that the family had moved elsewhere that day. He thanked her for the information and she replied, "It's ok, Daddy, Mommy sent me to get you". Asked about the story, Wiener's daughter reportedly asserted that "he never forgot who his children were! The rest of it, however, was pretty close to what actually happened ..."

In the run-up to World War II (1939–45) Wiener became a member of the China Aid Society and the Emergency Committee in Aid of Displaced German Scholars. (Wiener had served as a visiting lecturer at Tsing-Hua University in 1935-1936.) He was interested in placing scholars such as Yuk-Wing Lee and Antoni Zygmund who had lost their positions.

=== During and after World War II ===
In 1941, Wiener accepted an appointment with the National Defense Research Committee at the invitation of Vannevar Bush. Assigned to work with the NDRC's Fire Control committee, his work on the automatic aiming and firing of anti-aircraft guns caused Wiener to investigate information theory independently of Claude Shannon and to invent the Wiener filter. (The now-standard practice of modeling an information source as a random process—in other words, as a variety of noise—is due to Wiener.) Initially his anti-aircraft work led him to write, with Arturo Rosenblueth and his research assistant Julian Bigelow, the 1943 article 'Behavior, Purpose and Teleology', which was published in Philosophy of Science. Subsequently his anti-aircraft work led him to formulate cybernetics. Wiener left the NDRC when his contract ended in 1943.

After the war, his fame helped MIT to recruit a research team in cognitive science, composed of researchers in neuropsychology and the mathematics and biophysics of the nervous system, including Warren Sturgis McCulloch and Walter Pitts. These men later made pioneering contributions to computer science and artificial intelligence. Soon after the group was formed, Wiener suddenly ended all contact with its members, mystifying his colleagues. This emotionally traumatized Pitts, and led to his career decline. In their biography of Wiener, Conway and Siegelman suggest that Wiener's wife Margaret, who detested McCulloch's bohemian lifestyle, engineered the breach.

Patrick D. Wall speculated that after the publication of Cybernetics, Wiener asked McCulloch for some physiological facts about the brain that he could then theorize. McCulloch told him "a mixture of what was known to be true and what McCulloch thought should be". Wiener then theorized it, went to a physiology congress, and was shot down. Wiener was convinced that McCulloch had set him up.

Wiener later helped develop the theories of cybernetics, robotics, computer control, and automation. He discussed the modeling of neurons with John von Neumann, and in a letter from November 1946 von Neumann presented his thoughts in advance of a meeting with Wiener.

Wiener always shared his theories and findings with other researchers, and credited the contributions of others. These included Soviet researchers and their findings. Wiener's acquaintance with them caused him to be regarded with suspicion during the Cold War. He was a strong advocate of automation to improve the standard of living, and to end economic underdevelopment. His ideas became influential in India, whose government he advised during the 1950s.

After the war, Wiener became increasingly concerned with what he believed was political interference with scientific research, and the militarization of science. His article "A Scientist Rebels" from the January 1947 issue of The Atlantic Monthly urged scientists to consider the ethical implications of their work. After the war, he refused to accept any government funding or to work on military projects. The way Wiener's beliefs concerning nuclear weapons and the Cold War contrasted with those of von Neumann is the major theme of the book John Von Neumann and Norbert Wiener.

He continued his collaborations with Rosenblueth, visiting Mexico's Instituto Nacional de Cardiología (National Institute of Cardiology) at the latter's invitation beginning in 1945. He wrote much of Cybernetics while in residence there. Rosenblueth and Wiener subsequently received a five-year grant from the Rockefeller Foundation to support their collaboration in Mexico and at MIT. Together, they developed "the first mathematical model of circus movement reentry" in 1946.

He was a Fulbright scholar at the Collège de France (1951), visiting lecturer at the Tata Institute of Fundamental Research (1953-1954), guest professor at the Indian Statistical Institute, Calcutta (1955-1956), the University of Naples (1960-1961), and the Netherlands Central Institute for Brain Research (1964), where he was honorary head of the neurocybernetics department. Netherlands.

Wiener was a participant of the Macy conferences.

=== Personal life ===
In 1926, Wiener married Margaret Engemann, an assistant professor of modern languages at Juniata College. They had two daughters.

Wiener admitted in his autobiography I Am a Mathematician: The Later Life of a Prodigy to abusing Benzedrine throughout his life without being fully aware of its dangers.

A famous anecdote demonstrates his dedication to teaching:

One day, [he] was walking across the campus of Massachusetts Institute of Technology. While he was walking, someone stopped him and asked a question about Fourier analysis. Wiener didn't hesitate. He took out a small piece of paper and carefully wrote down the answer, explaining it step by step. The person was very thankful, said thanks, and started to leave. But Wiener stopped him and asked, "Just one moment—which direction was I walking when you met me?" The man pointed in the direction Wiener had been heading. Wiener smiled and said, "Good. That means I've already had my lunch."

Wiener died on March 18, 1964, aged 69, in Stockholm, from a heart attack. Wiener and his wife are buried at the Vittum Hill Cemetery in Sandwich, New Hampshire.

=== Awards and honors ===
- Wiener was a Plenary Speaker of the ICM in 1936 at Oslo and in 1950 at Cambridge, Massachusetts.
- Wiener won the Bôcher Memorial Prize in 1933 and the National Medal of Science in 1963, presented by President Johnson at a White House Ceremony in January 1964, shortly before Wiener's death.
- Wiener won the 1965 U.S. National Book Award in Science, Philosophy and Religion for God & Golem, Inc.: A Comment on Certain Points where Cybernetics Impinges on Religion.
- The Norbert Wiener Prize in Applied Mathematics was endowed in 1967 in honor of Norbert Wiener by MIT's mathematics department and is provided jointly by the American Mathematical Society and Society for Industrial and Applied Mathematics.
- The Norbert Wiener Award for Social and Professional Responsibility awarded annually by CPSR, was established in 1987 in honor of Wiener to recognize contributions by computer professionals to socially responsible use of computers.
- The crater Wiener on the far side of the Moon is named after him.
- The Norbert Wiener Center for Harmonic Analysis and Applications, at the University of Maryland, College Park, is named in his honor.
- Robert A. Heinlein named a spaceship after him in his 1957 novel Citizen of the Galaxy, a "Free Trader" ship called the Norbert Wiener mentioned in Chapter 14.
- The Norbert Wiener Center for Harmonic Analysis and Applications (NWC) in the Department of Mathematics at the University of Maryland, College Park is devoted to the scientific and mathematical legacy of Norbert Wiener. The NWC website highlights the research activities of the center. Further, each year the Norbert Wiener Center hosts the February Fourier Talks, a two-day national conference displaying advances in pure and applied harmonic analysis in industry, government, and academia.
- Honorary degrees: Tufts University (1946), University of Mexico (1951), Grinnell College (1957)

=== Doctoral students ===
- Shikao Ikehara (PhD 1930)
- Dorothy Walcott Weeks (PhD 1930)
- Norman Levinson (Sc.D. 1935)
- Brockway McMillan (PhD 1939)
- Abe Gelbart (PhD 1940)
- John P. Costas (engineer) (PhD 1951)
- Amar Bose (Sc.D. 1956)
- George Zames (Sc.D. 1960)
- Colin Cherry (PhD 1956)

== Work ==
Information is information, not matter or energy.

— Norbert Wiener, Cybernetics: Or Control and Communication in the Animal and the Machine

Wiener was an early studier of stochastic and mathematical noise processes, contributing work relevant to electronic engineering, electronic communication, and control systems. It was Wiener's idea to model a signal as if it were an exotic type of noise, giving it a sound mathematical basis. The example often given to students is that English text could be modeled as a random string of letters and spaces, where each letter of the alphabet (and the space) has an assigned probability. But Wiener dealt with analog signals, where such a simple example does not exist. Wiener's early work on information theory and signal processing was limited to analog signals, and was largely forgotten with the development of the digital theory.

Wiener is one of the key originators of cybernetics, a formalization of the notion of feedback, with many implications for engineering, systems control, computer science, biology, philosophy, and the organization of society. While he claims the field arose during his personal development, it has roots in the works of Leibnitz, Kierkegaard, Babbage, Maxwell, and Gibbs. His work with cybernetics influenced Gregory Bateson and Margaret Mead, and through them, anthropology, sociology, and education.

In the mathematical field of probability, the "Wiener sausage" is a neighborhood of the trace of a Brownian motion up to a time t, given by taking all points within a fixed distance of Brownian motion. It can be visualized as a cylinder of fixed radius the centerline of which is Brownian motion.

=== Wiener equation ===
A simple mathematical representation of Brownian motion, the Wiener equation, named after Wiener, assumes the current velocity of a fluid particle fluctuates randomly.

=== Wiener filter ===
For signal processing, the Wiener filter is a filter proposed by Wiener during the 1940s and published in 1942 as a classified document, which was funded by the National Defense Research Committee. Its purpose is to reduce the amount of noise present in a signal by comparison with an estimate of the desired noiseless signal. Wiener developed the filter at the Radiation Laboratory at MIT to predict the position of German bombers from radar reflections. What emerged was a mathematical theory of great generality – a theory for predicting the future as best one can on the basis of incomplete information about the past. It was a statistical theory that included applications that did not, strictly speaking, predict the future, but only tried to remove noise. It made use of Wiener's earlier work on integral equations and Fourier transforms.

=== Nonlinear control theory ===
Wiener studied polynomial chaos, a key piece of which is the Hermite-Laguerre expansion. This was developed in detail in Nonlinear Problems in Random Theory.

Wiener applied Hermite-Laguerre expansion to nonlinear system identification and control. Specifically, a nonlinear system can be identified by inputting a white noise process and computing the Hermite-Laguerre expansion of its output. The identified system can then be controlled.

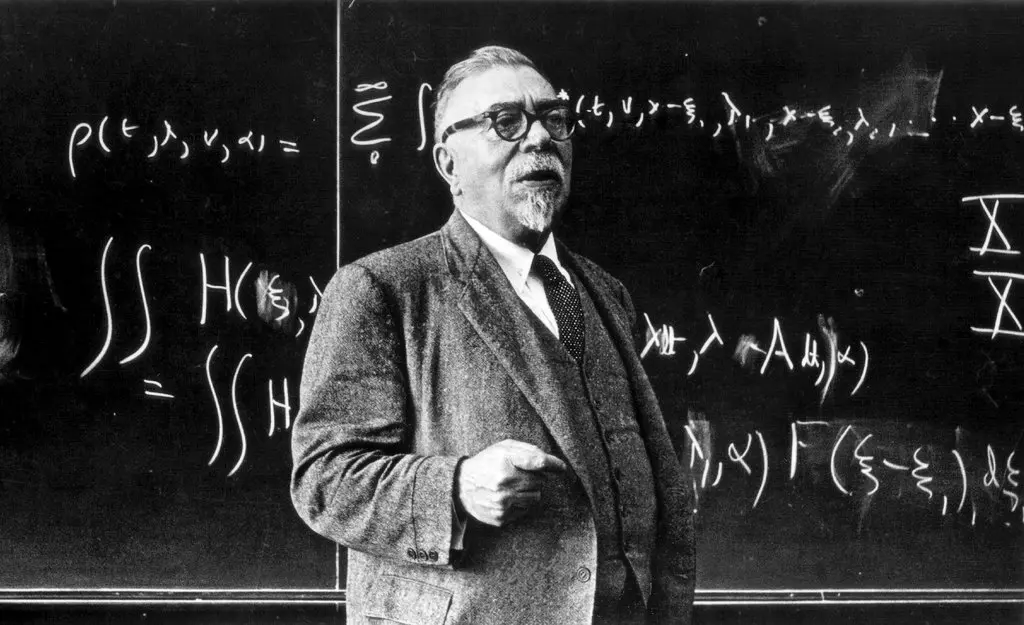
Wiener in MIT, 1963

=== In mathematics ===
Wiener took a great interest in the mathematical theory of Brownian motion (named after Robert Brown) proving many results now widely known, such as the non-differentiability of the paths. Consequently, the one-dimensional version of Brownian motion was named the Wiener process. It is the best known of the Lévy processes, càdlàg stochastic processes with stationary statistically independent increments, and occurs frequently in pure and applied mathematics, physics and economics (e.g. on the stock-market).

Wiener's tauberian theorem, a 1932 result of Wiener, developed Tauberian theorems in summability theory, on the face of it a chapter of real analysis, by showing that most of the known results could be encapsulated in a principle taken from harmonic analysis. In its present formulation, the theorem of Wiener does not have any obvious association with Tauberian theorems, which deal with infinite series; the translation from results formulated for integrals, or using the language of functional analysis and Banach algebras, is however a relatively routine process.

The Paley–Wiener theorem relates growth properties of entire functions on C^{n} and Fourier transformation of Schwartz distributions of compact support.

The Wiener–Khinchin theorem, (also known as the Wiener – Khintchine theorem and the Khinchin – Kolmogorov theorem), states that the power spectral density of a wide-sense-stationary random process is the Fourier transform of the corresponding autocorrelation function.

An abstract Wiener space is a mathematical object in measure theory, used to construct a "decent", strictly positive and locally finite measure on an infinite-dimensional vector space. Wiener's original construction only applied to the space of real-valued continuous paths on the unit interval, known as classical Wiener space. Leonard Gross provided the generalization to the case of a general separable Banach space.

The notion of a Banach space itself was discovered independently by both Wiener and Stefan Banach at around the same time.

== Views ==
=== Judaism ===
Due to his ancestry, Judaism played a significant role in shaping his character and sense of self. While neither his father nor Wiener were religious, he credits the Jewish social and cultural structure in fostering certain aspects of his development. He writes: "The Jews seem to me primarily a community and a social entity although most of them have been members of a religion as well". Even with the increased rapprochement between Jewish and non-Jewish communities, he notes that particular facets of Jewish life and culture have persisted.

Jewish family structures are described by Wiener as being closer than their European and American peers, from which religious, racial prejudice and minority prejudice has had an effect historically "modified their psychology and their attitude toward life". He believes that the emphasis and encouragement of scholarly pursuits in Judaism and community structures—as compared with Christianity historically—meant that biological and cultural traits tended to solidify over time as compared to Christianity where there were greater rates of diffusion.

Let me insert here a word or two about the Jewish family structure which is not irrelevant to the Jewish tradition of learning. At all times, the young learned man, and especially the rabbi, whether or not he had an ounce of practical judgment and was able to make a good career for himself in life, was always a match for the daughter of the rich merchant.

Because of such tendencies within Jewish culture, this meant scholars were more likely to have larger families which—in his view, which according to Wiener was also shared by his fellow collegiate and friend J. B. S. Haldane—amplified certain biological and cultural traits within the Jewish community. He expressed ambivilance on issues related to Jewish nationalism and Zionism, and distanced the Jewish character from such manifestations. He did not see Jewish identity as resting on such institutions:

I am saying nothing about Zionism and other forms of Jewish nationalism, for the Jews are much older than any movements of this sort which have amounted to more than literary and ritual conventions, and might well continue to exist even though the new state of Israel succumbs or gives way to other manifestations of nationalism.

While his family had a tradition of claiming descendance from Moses Maimonides, praising their emphasis on secular learning, he was more certain of being descended from Aqiba Eger, who—whilst being one of the greatest talmudic authorities according to Wiener—opposed it.

== In popular culture ==
- His work with Mary Brazier is referred to in Avis DeVoto's As Always, Julia.
- A flagship named after him appears briefly in Citizen of the Galaxy by Robert Heinlein.
- The song "Dedicated to Norbert Wiener" appears as the second track on the 1980 album Why? by G.G. Tonet (Luigi Tonet), released on the Italian It Why label.
- He is mentioned in Dan Simmons's science fiction novel Hyperion when discussing artificial intelligence and God.

== Publications ==
Wiener wrote many books and hundreds of articles: (Note: A full bibliography is given by the Cybernetics Society.)

- 1914, "A simplification in the logic of relations". Proceedings of the Cambridge Philosophical Society. 13: 387–390. 1912–1914. Reprinted in van Heijenoort, Jean (1967). From Frege to Gödel: A source book in mathematical logic, 1879–1931. Harvard University Press. pp. 224–227.
- 1930, Wiener, Norbert (1930). "Generalized harmonic analysis". Acta Math. 55 (1): 117–258. doi:10.1007/BF02546511.
- 1933, The Fourier Integral and Certain of its Applications. Cambridge Univ. Press. November 17, 1988. ISBN 978-0-521-35884-2 – via Google. reprint by Dover, CUP Archive 1988 ISBN 0-521-35884-1
- 1942, Extrapolation, Interpolation and Smoothing of Stationary Time Series. A war-time classified report nicknamed "the yellow peril" because of the color of the cover and the difficulty of the subject. Published postwar 1949 MIT Press.
- 1948, Cybernetics: Or Control and Communication in the Animal and the Machine. Paris, (Hermann & Cie) & Camb. Mass. (MIT Press) ISBN 978-0-262-73009-9; 2nd revised ed. 1961.
- 1950, The Human Use of Human Beings. The Riverside Press (Houghton Mifflin Co.).
- 1958, Nonlinear Problems in Random Theory. MIT Press & Wiley.
- 1964, God & Golem, Inc.: A Comment on Certain Points Where Cybernetics Impinges on Religion. MIT Press.
- 1966, Generalized Harmonic Analysis and Tauberian Theorems. MIT Press.
- 1993, Invention: The Care and Feeding of Ideas; This was written in 1954 but Wiener abandoned the project at the editing stage and returned his advance. MIT Press published it posthumously in 1993.

Wiener's papers are collected in the following works:

- 1964, Selected Papers of Norbert Wiener. Cambridge Mass. 1964 (MIT Press & SIAM)
- 1976–84, The Mathematical Work of Norbert Wiener. Masani P (ed) 4 vols, Camb. Mass. (MIT Press). This contains a complete collection of Wiener's mathematical papers with commentaries, in the following volumes: Vol. 1, Mathematical philosophy and foundations; potential theory; Brownian movement, Wiener integrals, ergodic and chaos theories, turbulence and statistical mechanics (ISBN 0262230704); Vol. 2, Generalized harmonic analysis and Tauberian theory, classical harmonic and complex analysis (ISBN 0262230925); Vol. 3, The Hopf-Wiener integral equation; Prediction and filtering; Quantum mechanics and relativity; Miscellaneous mathematical papers (ISBN 0262231077); and Vol. 4, Cybernetics, science, and society; Ethics, aesthetics, and literary criticism; Book reviews and obituaries. (ISBN 0262231239)

Fiction:

- 1959, The Tempter. Random House (on Oliver Heaviside's invention for lower distortion on telegraph lines and his fight with AT&T for the proper recognition of his analysis)

Autobiography:

- Wiener, Norbert (2018). Kline, Ronald (ed.). Norbert Wiener — A Life in Cybernetics. MIT Press. ISBN 9780262535441. Includes both volumes of Wiener's autobiography.
- 1953, Ex-Prodigy: My Childhood and Youth. MIT Press.
- 1956, I am a Mathematician. London (Gollancz).

Under the name "W. Norbert":

- 1952, The Brain and other short science fiction in Tech Engineering News.

== See also ==
- Autowave
- Box–Muller transform
- Cellular automaton
- Cybernetics in the Soviet Union
- Dualism (cybernetics)
- Functional integration
- Operational calculus
- Smoothing problem (stochastic processes)
- List of things named after Norbert Wiener
