= Joseph Rosen (professor) =

Israeli optoelectronics professor (born 1958)

- יוסף רוזן
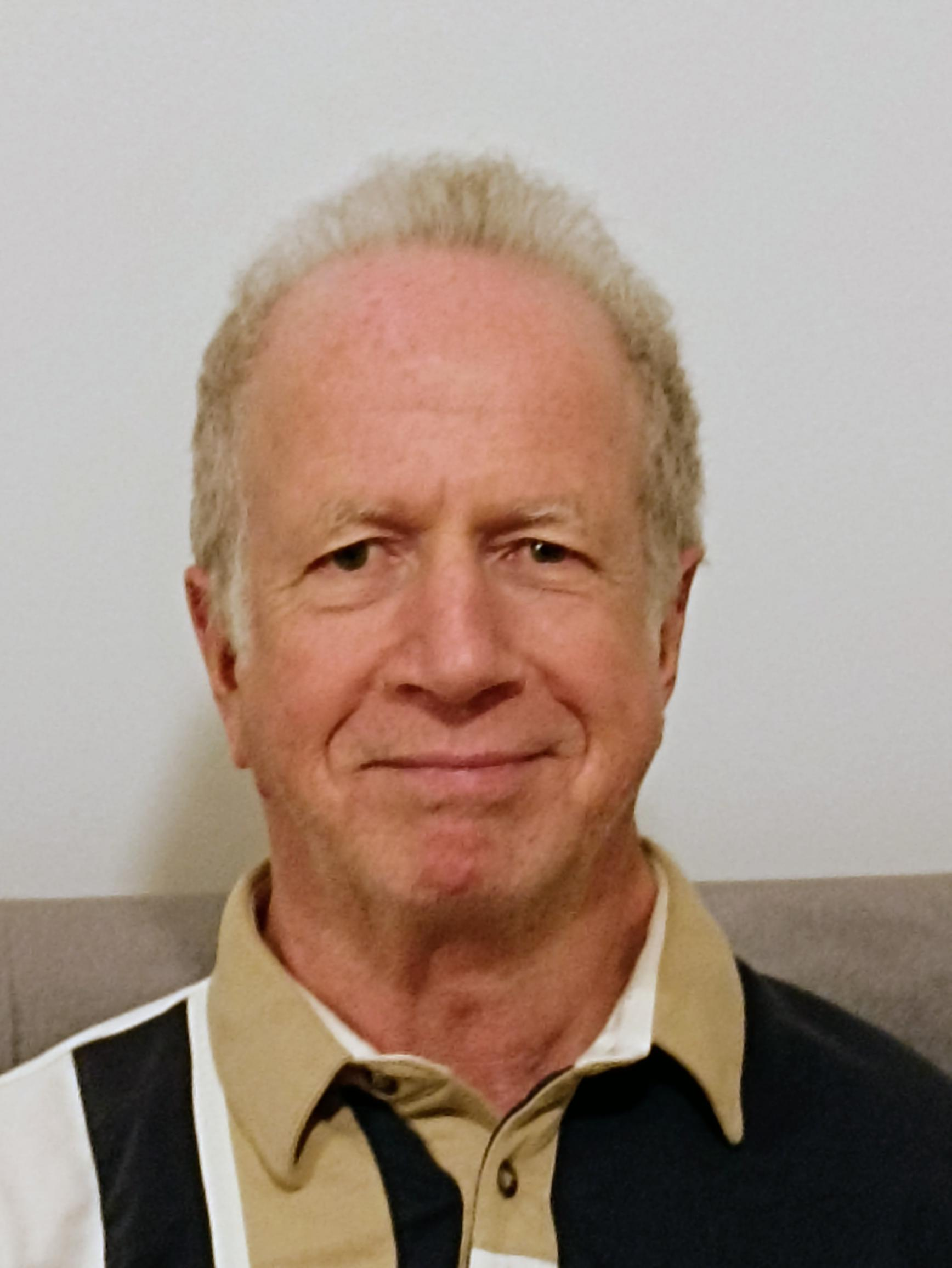
- Born: 1958 (age 67–68); Haifa, Israel
- Education: Technion
- Awards: Optica fellow, SPIE fellow, 2025 Lohmann Holography Award from Springer Nature
- Scientific career
- Fields: Optics, Holography
- Workplaces: Ben Gurion University of the Negev, Caltech
- Thesis: Interferometric Electro-Optical Signal Processing (1992)

Joseph Rosen (Hebrew: יוסף (יוסי) רוזן; born: 1958) is the Benjamin H. Swig Professor in Optoelectronics at the School of Electrical & Computer Engineering of Ben-Gurion University of the Negev, Israel.

His work focuses on Optics, Holography, Digital Optics and Computational Optics. He is a fellow of Optica and a fellow of SPIE, the international society for optics and photonics.

== Early life and education ==
Joseph Rosen was born in Haifa, Israel. Rosen began his academic studies in the Faculty of Electrical Engineering at the Technion - Israel Institute of Technology and received his B.Sc. in 1984 (with honors), and M.Sc. in 1987. He continued his studies at the Electrical Engineering Faculty of the Technion. His D.Sc. thesis on Interferometric Electro-Optical Signal Processing was received in 1992 and supervised by Prof. Joseph Shamir.

== Academic career ==
Rosen was a research associate at the Rome Laboratory of Hanscom Air Force Base, Massachusetts during 1992–1993. He then joined the Department of Applied Physics at California Institute of Technology as a Research Fellow. In 1996, Rosen joined Ben-Gurion University of the Negev as a Senior Lecturer at the Department of Electrical & Computer Engineering. He became an associate professor in 2000 and a professor in 2007.

During the years, Rosen held visiting academic positions at Johns Hopkins University and at Alfried Krupp Wissenschaftskolleg, Greifswald, Germany; the University of Electro-Communications (UEC), Tokyo, Japan; the University of Connecticut and Stellenbosch Institute for Advanced Study, South Africa.

Rosen has supervised more than 20 graduate students and postdoctoral fellows.

== Research ==
Rosen's work focuses on Digital and Computational Optics, Holography, and Optical Imaging.

He became known for his contributions to the technology of incoherent digital holography. In 2007, he co-invented the Fresnel Incoherent Correlation Holography (FINCH), a new method of recording digital holograms of targets illuminated by white light. In 2017 he co-invented the interferenceless Coded Aperture Correlation Holography (I-COACH), a new way of recording digital holograms without wave interference. FINCH and I-COACH are used for three-dimensional imaging of general three-dimensional objects observed from a single viewpoint using a single camera shot.

In 2018, Rosen co-invented an image reconstruction method called non-linear reconstruction which has now become one of the widely used methods in coded aperture imaging and incoherent holography

In 2019, Rosen, Postdoc Vijayakumar Anand, and PhD student Angika Bulbul introduced a method of using partial aperture area of a primary mirror to obtain a similar image resolution to the full aperture area. This can save cost, time and material needed for space telescopes. Based on their patent, a startup company, Remondo, plans to launch its first satellite to orbit in mid-2027 with the proposed PAIS (partial aperture imaging system).

In 2022, the non-linear reconstruction method co-invented by Rosen was combined with the well-known deconvolution method Lucy-Richardson algorithm to create Lucy-Richardson-Rosen algorithm. The Lucy-Richardson-Rosen algorithm exhibited a significantly improved performance in convergence and estimation of the solution compared to Lucy-Richardson algorithm. The Lucy-Richardson-Rosen algorithm was initially demonstrated to deconvolve blurred mid-infrared images obtained from the microspectroscopy system of the Australian synchrotron. Later, it was found to exhibit good deconvolution for spatially symmetric point spread functions.

Prof. Rosen has authored more than 300 scientific publications, including two books and 15 patents.

== Professional experience ==
Rosen was a consultant to Concealogram Ltd., Israel, which develops image processing technology to encrypt hidden images and data, and to CellOptic Inc., USA, which develops holographic imaging technology for biomedical and industrial research.

Rosen was also a member of the Editorial Advisory Committee of Optics & Photonics News; an Associate Editor of Advances in Optical Technologies - an open access journal by John Wiley & Sons Ltd; Topical Editor in the Journal of Applied Optics; a member of the editorial board of The Open Optics Journal by Bentham Science Publishers, Web Journal 3D Research by Springer, and eLight by Springer-Nature and CIOMP, CAS.

== Honors and awards ==
In 2005 Rosen was elected as a Fellow of the Optical Society of America (OSA, now called OPTICA), "for initiating the research of optical correlation in 3D space and introducing computer generated holography for controlling the diffraction and propagation properties of optical beams".

Rosen holds the Benjamin H. Swig Chair in Optoelectronics at Ben-Gurion University of the Negev since 2011.

He is also a Fellow of SPIE, the international society for optics and photonics "for achievements in digital holography and coherence optics" since 2012.

In 2025, Rosen received the Lohmann Holography Award from Springer Nature for his pioneering work in the field of holographic imaging science and technology.

== Publications ==
Books

- J. Rosen, Ed, Holography, Research and Technologies (Intech 2011).
- J. Rosen, Ed, Holography - Recent Advances and Applications (Intech 2023).
- J. Rosen, V. Anand, and N. Hai, Digital holography based on Aperture Engineering Spotlight series SL66 (SPIE Press 2023).

Selected articles

- 2007: J. Rosen and G. Brooker, "Digital spatially incoherent Fresnel holography," Opt. Lett. 32, pp. 912–914.
- 2008: J. Rosen and G. Brooker, "Non-scanning motionless fluorescence three-dimensional holographic microscopy," Nature Photon 2, pp. 190–195.
- 2009: N. Shaked, B. Katz, and J. Rosen, "Review of three-dimensional holographic imaging by multiple-viewpoint-projection based methods," Appl. Opt. 48, pp. H120-H136.
- 2011: J. Rosen, N. Siegel, and G. Brooker, "Theoretical and experimental demonstration of resolution beyond the Rayleigh limit by FINCH fluorescence microscopic imaging," Opt. Express 19, 26249–26268.
- 2014: R. Kelner, B. Katz, and J. Rosen, "Optical sectioning using a digital Fresnel incoherent-holography-based confocal imaging system," Optica 1, 70–74.
- 2016: A. Vijayakumar, Y. Kashter, R. Kelner, and J. Rosen, "Coded aperture correlation holography–a new type of incoherent digital holograms," Opt. Express 24, pp. 12430–12441.
- 2017: A. Vijayakumar and J. Rosen, "Interferenceless coded aperture correlation holography-a new technique for recording incoherent digital holograms without two-wave interference," Opt. Express 25, pp. 13883–13896.
- 2017: Y. Kashter, A. Vijayakumar, and J. Rosen, "Resolving images by blurring: superresolution method with a scattering mask between the observed objects and the hologram recorder," Optica 4, pp. 932–939.
- 2018: M. Rai, A. Vijayakumar, and J. Rosen, "Non-linear adaptive three-dimensional imaging with interferenceless coded aperture correlation holography (I-COACH)," Opt. Express 26, pp. 18143–18154.
- 2019: J. Rosen, A. Vijayakumar, M. Kumar, M. Rai, R. Kelner, Y. Kashter, A. Bulbul, and S. Mukherjee, "Recent advances in self-interference incoherent digital holography," Adv. Opt. Photon. 11, pp. 1–66.
- 2020: N. Hai and J. Rosen, "Coded aperture correlation holographic microscope for single-shot quantitative phase and amplitude imaging with extended field of view," Opt. Express 28, pp. 27372–27386.
- 2021: A. Bulbul, N. Hai, and J. Rosen, "Coded aperture correlation holography (COACH) with a superior lateral resolution of FINCH and axial resolution of conventional direct imaging systems," Opt. Express 29, pp. 42106–42118.

== Personal life ==
Rosen is married to Rona. They have two children, Oryan and Omer.
