= Andrew Campbell (computer scientist) =

Computer scientist

Andrew T. Campbell
- Born: 15 May 1959 (age 67)
- Citizenship: UK, USA
- Education: Aston University, England; City University, London, England; Lancaster University, England
- Occupations: Computer scientist, academic and researcher
- Known for: Mobile sensing, mental health, mobile computing, applied machine learning
- Scientific career
- Fields: Ubiquitous computing, applied machine learning, HCI
- Workplaces: Dartmouth College; Columbia University
- Doctoral advisor: David Hutchison
- Website: https://www.cs.dartmouth.edu/~campbell/

Andrew Thomas Campbell (born 15 May 1959) is a computer scientist who works in the field of ubiquitous computing. He is best known for his research on mobile sensing, applied machine learning, mental health and human behavioral modeling.

Campbell is the Albert Bradley 1915 Third Century professor in computer science at Dartmouth College. He joined Dartmouth Computer Science in 2005 after spending 10 years as a professor of Electrical Engineering at Columbia University. Prior to being on the faculty at Columbia, Campbell spent 10 years in the software industry working on the research and development of wireless networks and operating systems. He has worked on digital health as a visiting research scientist in the Android group at Google and at Verily Life Sciences.

Campbell has received a number of awards including the ACM SIGMOBILE Test of Time Paper Award for pioneering sensing and machine learning on smartphones and the ACM Ubicomp 10-year Impact Award for paving the way for numerous efforts in the area of stress detection from sensory data and also for pioneering the integration of mental health research with mobile data mining.

== Personal life ==
Campbell was born in Coventry, England, on 15 May 1959. He received a BSc in Mechanical Engineering from Aston University (1981) and then an MSc. in Computer Science from City, University of London. He worked in the software industry for a decade in England, the Netherlands and the USA before returning to university. He received his PhD in Computer Science from Lancaster University (1996).

He started as an assistant professor of Electrical Engineering at Columbia University in 1996 and was promoted to an associated professor with tenure in 2003. After a sabbatical year as a visiting professor at Cambridge University, he joined Dartmouth College in 2005. In 2018, he was named the Albert Bradley 1915 Third Century professor at Dartmouth College.

== Career ==
Campbell is best known for his work in ubiquitous computing, where he and his students first implemented sensing and machine learning algorithms on the iPhone when it was released in 2007. He is also known for the development of the StudentLife app (2014).

At Dartmouth, he led the StudentLife Study tracking over 200 undergraduate students across their 4 years of college using smartphone sensing and brain imaging to better understand the dynamics of mental health of students across their college years. This study was also the first to use mobile sensing to capture the impact of COVID-19 on student behavior and mental health outcomes during the pandemic. He has also studied mental health and performance in the workplace using mobile sensing.

== Awards and recognition ==
Campbell has received an NSF CAREER Award, IBM Faculty Award, AT&T Faculty Award, Google Faculty Award and EPSRC Fellow Award. His group has received multiple 10 year impact awards, including the ACM SenSys Test of Time Award (2018) and the ACM SIGMOBILE Test of Time Award (2019) for their work on the CenceMe app (2008), the ACM Ubicomp 10 Year Impact Award (2022) for their work on the StressSense app. More recently, his group also received the ACM Ubicomp 10-Year Impact Award (2024) for their work on the StudentLife Study. The citation for this 10-Year Impact Award said, "This groundbreaking paper has had an exceptional influence and significant impact on the field. It pioneered the integration of mental health research with mobile data mining, addressing real-world challenges in innovative ways. The availability of the dataset to the community also exemplifies exemplary research practices."

== Selected bibliography ==
- Emiliano Miluzzo, Nicholas D. Lane, Kristóf Fodor, Ronald A. Peterson, Hong Lu, Mirco Musolesi, Shane. B. Eisenman, Xiao Zheng, Andrew T. Campbell, Sensing Meets Mobile Social Networks: The Design, Implementation and Evaluation of the CenceMe Application. Proc. of 6th ACM Conference on Embedded Networked Sensor Systems (SenSys '08), Raleigh, NC, USA, Nov. 5–7, 2008. ACM SIGMOBILE Test of Time Award
- Rui Wang, Fanglin Chen, Zhenyu Chen, Tianxing Li, Gabriella Harari, Stefanie Tignor, Xia Zhou, Dror Ben-Zeev, and Andrew T. Campbell, StudentLife: Assessing Behavioral Trends, Mental Well-being and Academic Performance of College Students using Smartphones, ACM International Joint Conference on Pervasive and Ubiquitous Computing (UbiComp 2014), September 2014. ACM Ubicomp 10-Year Impact Award
- Huckins J, daSilva A, Wang W, Hedlund E, Rogers C, Nepal S, Wu J, Obuchi M, Murphy E, Meyer M, Wagner D, Holtzheimer P, Campbell A Mental Health and Behavior of College Students During the Early Phases of the COVID-19 Pandemic: Longitudinal Smartphone and Ecological Momentary Assessment Study, Journal of Medical Internet Research. 2020
- Harari GM, Lane ND, Wang R, Crosier BS, Campbell AT, Gosling SD. Using Smartphones to Collect Behavioral Data in Psychological Science: Opportunities, Practical Considerations, and Challenges. Perspectives on Psychological Science. 2016
- Hong Lu, Denise Frauendorfer, Mashfiqui Rabbi, Marianne Schmid Mast, Gokul T. Chittaranjan, Andrew T. Campbell, Daniel Gatica-Perez, and Tanzeem Choudhury. 2012. StressSense: detecting stress in unconstrained acoustic environments using smartphones. In Proceedings of the 2012 ACM Conference on Ubiquitous Computing (UbiComp '12). Association for Computing Machinery, New York, NY, USA, 351–360. ACM Ubicomp 10-Year Impact Award
- Rui Wang, Min S. H. Aung, Saeed Abdullah, Rachel Brian, Andrew T. Campbell, Tanzeem Choudhury, Marta Hauser, John Kane, Michael Merrill, Emily A. Scherer, Vincent W. S. Tseng, and Dror Ben-Zeev. 2016. CrossCheck: toward passive sensing and detection of mental health changes in people with schizophrenia. In Proceedings of the 2016 ACM International Joint Conference on Pervasive and Ubiquitous Computing (UbiComp '16). Association for Computing Machinery, New York, NY, USA, 886–897. ACM Ubicomp 10-Year Impact Award (Runner up)
- Shayan Mirjafari, Kizito Masaba, Ted Grover, Weichen Wang, Pino Audia, Andrew T. Campbell, Nitesh V. Chawla, Vedant Das Swain, Munmun De Choudhury, Anind K. Dey, Sidney K. D'Mello, Ge Gao, Julie M. Gregg, Krithika Jagannath, Kaifeng Jiang, Suwen Lin, Qiang Liu, Gloria Mark, Gonzalo J. Martinez, Stephen M. Mattingly, Edward Moskal, Raghu Mulukutla, Subigya Nepal, Kari Nies, Manikanta D. Reddy, Pablo Robles-Granda, Koustuv Saha, Anusha Sirigiri, and Aaron Striegel. 2019. Differentiating Higher and Lower Job Performers in the Workplace Using Mobile Sensing. Proc. ACM Interact. Mob. Wearable Ubiquitous Technol. 3, 2, Article 37 (June 2019)
- Mikio Obuchi, Jeremy F. Huckins, Weichen Wang, Alex daSilva, Courtney Rogers, Eilis Murphy, Elin Hedlund, Paul Holtzheimer, Shayan Mirjafari, and Andrew Campbell. 2020. Predicting Brain Functional Connectivity Using Mobile Sensing. Proc. ACM Interact. Mob. Wearable Ubiquitous Technol. 4, 1, Article 23, 2020
- Subigya Nepal, Wenjun Liu, Arvind Pillai, Weichen Wang, Vlado Vojdanovski, Jeremy F. Huckins, Courtney Rogers, Meghan L. Meyer, and Andrew T. Campbell. 2024. Capturing the College Experience: A Four-Year Mobile Sensing Study of Mental Health, Resilience and Behavior of College Students during the Pandemic. Proc. ACM Interact. Mob. Wearable Ubiquitous Technol. 8, 1, Article 38 (March 2024) ACM Ubicomp 2025 Distinguished Paper Award
