= List of psychological research methods =

A wide range of research methods are used in psychology. These methods vary by the sources from which information is obtained, how that information is sampled, and the types of instruments that are used in data collection. Methods also vary by whether they collect qualitative data, quantitative data or both.

Qualitative psychological research findings are not arrived at by statistical or other quantitative procedures. Quantitative psychological research findings result from mathematical modeling and statistical estimation or statistical inference. The two types of research differ in the methods employed, rather than the topics they focus on.

There are three main types of psychological research:

- Correlational research
- Descriptive research
- Experimental research

== Common methods ==
Common research designs and data collection methods include:

- Archival research
- Case study uses different research methods (e.g. interview, observation, self-report questionnaire) with a single case or small number of cases.
- Clustered randomized controlled trial
- Computer simulation (modeling)
- Ethnography
- Event sampling methodology, also referred to as experience sampling methodology, diary study, or ecological momentary assessment
- Experiment, often with separate treatment and control groups (see scientific control and design of experiments). See Experimental psychology for many details.
- Field experiment
- Focus group
- Interview, can be structured or unstructured.
- Meta-analysis
- Neuroimaging and other psychophysiological methods
- Observational study, can be naturalistic (see natural experiment), participant or controlled.
- Program evaluation
- Quasi-experiment
- Randomized control trial
- Self-report inventory
- Survey, often with a random sample (see survey sampling)
- Twin study

Research designs vary according to the period(s) of time over which data are collected:

- Retrospective cohort study: Participants are chosen, then data are collected about their past experiences.
- Prospective cohort study: Participants are recruited prior to the proposed independent effects being administered or occurring.
- Cross-sectional study: A population is sampled on all proposed measures at one point in time.
- Longitudinal study: Participants are studied at multiple time points. May address the cohort effect and help to indicate causal directions of effects.
- Cross-sequential study: Groups of different ages are studied at multiple time points; combines cross-sectional and longitudinal designs

Research in psychology has been conducted with both animals and human subjects:

- Animal study
- Human subject research
