= Digital phenotyping =

Multidisciplinary field of science

Digital phenotyping is a multidisciplinary field of science, first defined in a May 2016 paper in JMIR Mental Health authored by John Torous, Mathew V Kiang, Jeanette Lorme, and Jukka-Pekka Onnela as the "moment-by-moment quantification of the individual-level human phenotype in situ using data from personal digital devices." The data can be divided into two subgroups, called active data and passive data, where the former refers to data that requires active input from the users to be generated, whereas passive data, such as sensor data and phone usage patterns, are collected without requiring any active participation from the user.

Smartphones are well suited for digital phenotyping given their widespread adoption and ownership, the extent to which users engage with the devices, and richness of data that may be collected from them. Smartphone data can be used to study behavioral patterns, social interactions, physical mobility, gross motor activity, and speech production, among others. Smartphone ownership has been in steady rise globally over the past few years. For example, in the U.S., smartphone ownership among adults increased from 35% in 2011 to 64% in 2015, and in 2017 an estimated 95% of Americans own a cellphone of some kind and 77% own a smartphone.

The use of passive data collection from smartphone devices can provide granular information relevant to psychiatric, aging, frailty, and other illness phenotypes. Types of relevant passive data include GPS data to monitor spatial location, accelerometer data to record movement and gross motor activity, and call and messaging logs to document social engagement with others. Passively collected data may also support clinical differentiation between diagnostic groups and monitoring mental health symptoms.

The related term 'digital phenotype' was introduced in Nature Biotechnology by Sachin H. Jain and John Brownstein in 2015.

== Research platforms and commercialization ==
One of the first implementations of digital phenotyping on smart phones was the Funf Open Sensing Framework, developed at the MIT Media Lab and launched on October 5, 2011. Members of the Funf team interested in profiling and predicting human behavior formed a commercial venture called Behavio in 2012. In April 2013, it was announced that the Behavio team had joined Google. The Funf platform has inspired other mobile phone sensor logging platforms for psychology and behavior applications, such as the Purple Robot platform, developed by the CBITS (Center for Behavioral Intervention Technologies) at Northwestern University in 2012, which has since expanded and remains an active GITHUB project. Another early academic platform was StudentLife, developed at Dartmouth College in 2014 under Andrew T. Campbell, which used smartphone sensing (GPS, accelerometer, microphone, phone usage logs, etc.) to measure stress, mental health, academic performance, and behavioral trends in college students.

Among the academic research community, there are now many digital phenotyping platforms. Popular open-source digital phenotyping platforms include Beiwe, AWARE, StudyRun, EARS, mindLAMP, RADAR-CNS among others and there is currently no metric to determine which is most popular.

In terms of commercialization, in 2017, former head of the National Institutes of Mental Health, Tom Insel, joined Rick Klausner and Paul Dagum to form the founding team of MindStrong Health, which uses digital phenotyping methods combined with machine learning to develop new paradigms for mental health assessment and development of new digital biomarkers for mental health. As of 2021 the company's website does not mention digital phenotyping.

== Criticisms ==
The widespread adoption of digital phenotyping across diverse research domains necessitates robust methodological guidelines. Passive data collection, a cornerstone of this approach, poses a significant challenges at every stage of the research process. From the outset, researchers grapple with clearly defining the constructs under investigation, a task complicated by the obscure nature of digital phenomena. Subsequent decisions about data capture devices, applications, and cleaning protocols further amplify the complexity. The analysis phase introduces another layer of challenges, particularly when employing computationally demanding techniques such as machine learning. Optimizing model performance through careful data partitioning and hyperparameter tuning is essential but requires essential knowledge. Recently published templates aim to address these challenges by providing standardized approaches to digital phenotyping research, potentially facilitating greater consistency and comparability across studies.

== See also ==
- John Brownstein
- Jukka-Pekka Onnela
- Andrew T. Campbell
- Sachin H. Jain
- Scott L. Rauch
- Mobile phone based sensing software
