= Implementation fidelity =

Concept in program evaluation

Implementation fidelity (also called implementation integrity or treatment fidelity) is a concept in program evaluation that determines the extent to which anyone using a research design is actually able to follow the methodology.

A project with high fidelity is performed as designed.

== Further consideration ==
- Measuring Implementation Fidelity, 2009
- Implementation fidelity, 2015
- Working with Practitioners to Develop Measures of Implementation Fidelity, 2018
