= Jukka-Pekka Onnela =

Finnish academic (born 1976)

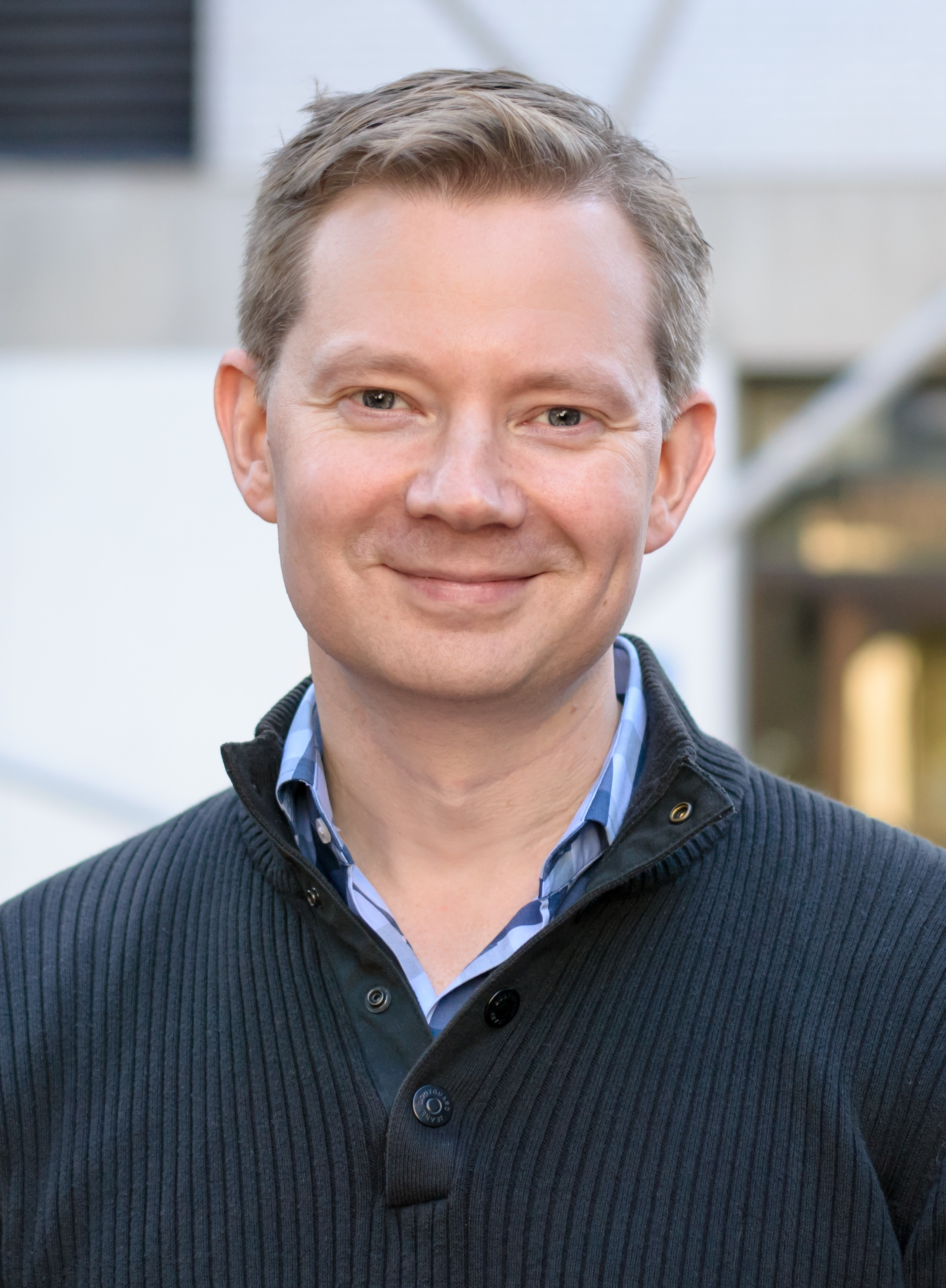
- Born: Jukka-Pekka Johannes Onnela; 1976 (age 49–50); Oulu, Finland
- Education: Helsinki University of Technology
- Known for: Statistical Network Science, Digital phenotyping, Beiwe Research Platform
- Awards: NIH Director's New Innovator Award (2013)
- Scientific career
- Fields: Complex Systems, Network Science, Digital phenotyping
- Workplaces: Harvard T.H. Chan School of Public Health
- Thesis: Complex networks in the study of financial and social systems (2006)
- Doctoral advisor: Kimmo Kaski
- Website: www.hsph.harvard.edu/onnela-lab/

Jukka-Pekka Onnela (born 1976) is a Professor of Biostatistics at the Harvard T.H. Chan School of Public Health and Co-Director of the Health Data Science Program. Onnela is known for his pioneering research using cell phone data in network science. He was awarded the NIH Director's New Innovator Award in 2013 for his work in digital phenotyping.

== Early life and education ==
Onnela was born in Oulu in 1976 and spent his youth in Kokkola. At age 16, he was awarded a national scholarship to attend the United World College of the Atlantic where he earned his International Baccalaureate. In 2002, he earned his M.Sc. in computational science from the Helsinki University of Technology (now Aalto University) and obtained his D.Sc. there in network science in 2006. His doctoral dissertation, titled Complex Networks in the Study of Financial and Social Systems, received dissertation of the year award from the university. He subsequently spent two years at the University of Oxford as a Junior Research Fellow, a year at the Harvard Kennedy School as a Fulbright Visiting Scholar, and two years as a Postdoctoral Fellow at Harvard Medical School. In 2011, he joined the Harvard T.H. Chan School of Public Health at Harvard University as an Assistant Professor of Biostatistics. He was promoted to Associate Professor in 2017 and Professor in 2023. He directs the Onnela Lab which focuses on statistical network science and digital phenotyping.

== Research ==
Starting in 2005, Onnela began using cell phone data to study human social behavior. His research focuses on statistical network science and digital phenotyping, defined as the “moment-by-moment quantification of the individual-level human phenotype using data from personal digital devices,” in particular smartphones. He was awarded a U.S. National Institutes of Health (NIH) Director's New Innovator Award in 2013 for his work in digital phenotyping.

== Beiwe ==
The Beiwe Research Platform for high-throughput smartphone-based digital phenotyping is one of a class of mobile phone based sensing softwares. It was developed by the Onnela Lab between 2013 and 2018 with funding from the National Institutes of Health. It is an open-source (under 3-clause BSD license) research platform intended for biomedical research which includes iOS and Android smartphone apps. The platform is named after Beaivi, the Sami deity of the fertility and sanity.
