= Aydogan Ozcan =

Turkish-American engineer and academic

- Born: Aydoğan Özcan; 1978 (age 47–48)
- Education: Bilkent University; Stanford University
- Known for: Mobile sensing; Medical diagnosis; Computational imaging
- Scientific career
- Fields: Electrical engineering; Optical engineering; Biomedical engineering
- Workplaces: Harvard Medical School; University of California, Los Angeles; Howard Hughes Medical Institute
- Thesis: Non-destructive characterization tools based on spectral interferometry and minimum phase functions (2005)
- Doctoral advisor: Gordon S. Kino; Michel J. F. Digonnet
- Website: research.seas.ucla.edu/ozcan/

Aydogan Ozcan (born 1978) is a Turkish-American engineer and inventor who is Chancellor's Professor and the Volgenau Chair for Engineering Innovation at University of California, Los Angeles. Also affiliated with Howard Hughes Medical Institute, he is best known for his contributions to optical mobile sensing and medical diagnosis technologies, and computational imaging techniques.

== Biography ==
Born in 1978, Ozcan received B.S. degree in electrical and electronics engineering from Bilkent University in 2000 and M.S. and Ph.D. degrees from Stanford University in 2002 and 2005, respectively. Following a postdoctoral fellowship at the same institution, he became a research faculty at Wellman Center for Photomedicine of Harvard Medical School. In 2007, he became a faculty member at UCLA Samueli School of Engineering of University of California, Los Angeles. In 2014, he was named a Howard Hughes Medical Institute Professor. Ozcan also serves as the associate director of California NanoSystems Institute, as well as the editor-in-chief of the scientific journal eLight.

Ozcan's main research interests includes computational microscopy, point-of-care testing and optical computing. His research laboratory has developed low-cost photonics-based telemedicine technologies for smartphones. In 2014, he was elected as an Optica Fellow "for contributions to computational imaging, sensing and holography technologies, and instrumentation impacting bio-photonics and its applications to telemedicine and global health." In 2025, he was elected a member of National Academy of Engineering for "for contributions to mobile sensing and telepathology for medical diagnostics." He is also a fellow of American Association for the Advancement of Science, SPIE, American Institute for Medical and Biological Engineering, IEEE, Royal Society of Chemistry, National Academy of Inventors and American Physical Society, as well as a member of European Academy of Sciences and Arts.

In 2009, he was listed as a laureate of Innovators Under 35 by MIT Technology Review.

== Selected publications ==
- Rivenson, Yair; Göröcs, Zoltán; Günaydin, Harun; Zhang, Yibo; Wang, Hongda; Ozcan, Aydogan (2017). "Deep learning microscopy". Optica. 4 (11): 1437–1443. arXiv:1705.04709. doi:10.1364/OPTICA.4.001437.
- Rivenson, Yair; Zhang, Yibo; Günaydın, Harun; Teng, Da; Ozcan, Aydogan (2018). "Phase recovery and holographic image reconstruction using deep learning in neural networks". Light: Science & Applications. 7: 17141. doi:10.1038/lsa.2017.141. PMC 6060068.
- Lin, Xing; Rivenson, Yair; Yardimci, Nezih T.; Luo, Yi; Jarrahi, Mona; Ozcan, Aydogan (2018). "All-optical machine learning using diffractive deep neural networks". Science. 361 (6406): 1004–1008. arXiv:1804.08711. doi:10.1126/science.aat8084.
- Barbastathis, George; Ozcan, Aydogan; Situ, Guohai (2019). "On the use of deep learning for computational imaging". Optica. 8 (8): 921–943. doi:10.1364/OPTICA.6.000921. hdl:1721.1/126023.
