= Ambulatory assessment =

Computer-assisted medical methodology

Ambulatory assessment (AA) is computer-assisted methodology for self-reports, behavior records or psychological measurements, while the subject undergoes normal activities in daily life.

AA is used in clinical psychology to investigate symptoms, predict the recurrence or onset of new symptoms, monitor treatment effects, prevent relapse, and indicate necessary interventions.

In the early ambulatory assessment, personal digital assistants and interactive voice response systems were used. They have now been replaced by smartphones, and this has made data collection more feasible.

== Characteristics ==
1. The recording takes place in real-life situations
2. A computer-assisted methodology is widely used
3. The evaluator attempts to minimise the method dependent reactivity and strives to achieve a high degree of ecological balance
4. The assessment can be continuous, event-based, interactive, time-based, or randomly prompted
5. It is idiographic in focus and allows for the examination of multiple individual processes

The Ambulatory assessment can be applied in various areas of psychology and other behavioral sciences.

== Modes of Data Collection ==
=== Event Controlled/Self-Report ===
The subject self-monitors the happenings of events and assess them whenever it occurs. Varieties of devices are used to collect the data from the self reports.

The main concern with the self-report assessment is whether biases may influence the credibility of the results.

=== Time Controlled/Observational ===
In this mode, the subject follows the time-sampling schedule. This mode provides the data through the observer’s point of view. Forms of Ambulatory assessment observational method are Electronically Activated Recorder (EAR), Global Positioning System (GPS) in phones or devices on the person. Light sensors to infer context, using video or sensors to detect interactions with others.

== See also ==
- Experience sampling method
