= Event sampling methodology =

Event sampling methodology (ESM) refers to a diary study. ESM is also known as ecological momentary assessment (EMA) or experience sampling methodology. ESM includes sampling methods that allow researchers to study ongoing experiences and events by taking assessments one or more times per day per participant (n=1) in the naturally occurring social environment. ESM enables researchers to study the prevalence of behaviors, promote theory development, and to serve an exploratory role. The frequent sampling of events inherent in ESM enables researchers to measure the typology of activity and detect the temporal and dynamic fluctuations of experiences (e.g., at work, or in a relationship). The popularity of ESM as a new form of research design increased over the recent years, because it addresses the shortcomings of cross-sectional research which cannot detect intra-individual variances and processes across time and cause-effect relationships. In ESM, participants are asked to record their experiences and perceptions in a paper or electronic diary. Diary studies allow for the studying of events that occur naturally but are difficult to examine in the lab. For conducting event sampling, SurveySignal and Expimetrics. are becoming popular platforms for social science researchers.

Some authors also use the term experience sampling to encompass passive data derived from sources such as smartphones, wearable sensors, the Internet of Things, email and social media that do not require explicit input from participants. These methods can be advantageous as they impose less demand on participants improving compliance and allowing data to be collected for much longer periods, are less likely to change the behaviour being studied and allow data to be sampled at much high rates and with greater precision. Many research questions can benefit from both active and passive forms of experience sampling.

== Types ==
There are three types of ESM procedures:

1. Signal contingent – some form of notification, such as SMS text messaging, or beeping from a pager or wristwatch, notifies participants to record data at either fixed or random intervals. An advantage of this type of ESM is minimization of recall bias. An additional advantage when used in conjunction with online data collection is improved response rates and timeliness by sending a reminder signal if the participant does not respond within a specified time.
2. Event contingent – participant records any occurrence of certain pre-determined events. This form is most useful when the event is fairly infrequent. It also allows flexibility for tracking events that typically fluctuate on their own. Clear definition(s) for the events of interest are important for not distorting the frequency and allowing the participant to make an easy distinction as to whether or not the event has occurred.
3. Interval contingent – records data according to the passing of a certain period of time. Typically, participants are asked to self-report on the behavior of interest at pre-determined intervals which are determined on the basis of either theoretical or logical units of time. The selection of the interval itself is crucial for not leading to skewed perception of the behavior, but it also is important that it is not taxing on the participants. A day is the most commonly used sampling unit.

=== Strengths ===
There are many strengths to using ESM. The first is that it highlights the possible situations and roles that behavior may be contingent upon. That is, it serves as a demonstration of the interaction between the person and the context and provides insight to the contingencies of behavior. A second strength of ESM is that it provides ecological validity because the data is collected in the participant's natural environment, and this allows greater generalizability of the resulting data. Another strength is that it provides an excellent tool to measure individual differences and the differences the emerge or change over time. The fact that ESM avoid some of the typical problems of ESM is a fourth strength. With typical self-report measures, there can be concerns with memory or recall bias where participants may have difficulty recalling the past. A final strength of ESM is that is serves as a demonstration of the usefulness of multi methods assessment. The results and application of ESM are most useful when they are used in combination with global reports, for instance.

=== Limitations ===
ESM has several disadvantages. One of the disadvantages of ESM is it can sometimes be perceived as invasive and intrusive by participants. ESM also leads to possible self-selection bias. It may be that only certain types of individuals are willing to participate in this type of study creating an unrepresentative sample. Another concern is related to participant cooperation. Participants may not be actually fill out their diaries at the specified times and concern has been raised difference in diary format may be influential in compliance. However recent research found that research that focuses on mean levels, between-person differences, and correlations among variables are less likely to be impacted by the difference between electronic and paper diary methods. Research reported that some participants experience the repeated assessments as taxing. Further concerns are related to the fact that ESM may substantively change the phenomenon being studied. Reactivity or priming effects may occur, such that repeated measurement may cause changes in the participants' experiences. This method of sampling data is also highly vulnerable to common method variance.

Further, it is important to think about whether or not an appropriate dependent variable is being used in an ESM design. For example, it might be logical to use ESM in order to answer research questions which involve dependent variables with a great deal of variation throughout the day. Thus, variables such as change in mood, change in stress level, or the immediate impact of particular events may be best studied using ESM methodology. However, it is not likely that utilizing ESM will yield meaningful predictions when measuring someone performing a repetitive task throughout the day, when outcomes are long-term in nature (e.g., coronary heart problems), or inherently stable variables.

== Statistical techniques ==
The possible techniques for analyzing data from ESM are important to consider. ESM produces a large amount of data which is one issue, but there are also considerations to factor into the analysis decision such as nesting, serial dependence, and an imbalance in the number and variance of data points. Options range from calculating composites, using regression analyses, or modeling through multilevel or hierarchically nested models. The most frequently used modeling options for diary data include Hierarchical Linear Modeling (HLM) software, MLWin, and vector autoregression.

== See also ==
- Diary studies
- Experience sampling method
- Mobile phone-based sensing software
