= Diary studies in TESOL =

Diary on teaching or learning

A diary study is an in-depth reflection on learning processes or teaching experiences regularly kept by an individual and then analyzed to look for recurring patterns or significant events. Diary studies are often used in qualitative studies and can be analyzed by diarists themselves or by researchers. It is a research genre gaining popularity in the TESOL field. Originated from both psychological and anthropological research, diary studies involve systematic personal accounts of the feelings, thoughts, beliefs, attitudes and reactions over a period of time. In other words, it is a kind of self-observation, introspection and retrospection. Diarists can freely write about their thoughts and have no need to answer some previously imposed questions for the research. We can often find unexpected underlying factors, especially affective factors through diary studies. Common external research tools such as observation cannot reach the affective part so far.

== Types ==
=== Learning diary ===
There are two broad types of diary study in the field of TESOL: learning diary and teaching diary. Learning diaries, also known as learner diaries, can be documented as a pedagogical tool for teachers in the EFL classroom to discover learners' perception of classroom activities, learning difficulties and their interaction with teachers and peers. They can be adopted as a research tool to gain insight into learners' language learning experiences. A well-known diary study in this field is Schmidt and Fronta's research on Schmidt's Portuguese learning diary in Brazil. In addition, learner diaries can be documented as a teacher training tool in teacher education programs to help pre-service teachers have varied and rich perceptions about teaching. A learner diary can not only fill gaps between what we generally think and what diarists really think, but also enhance learner autonomy. By keeping the diary, learners can have a clearer idea of their current learning progress and try to find different strategies to manage their own learning.

=== Teaching diary ===
Teaching diaries can offer a fresh perspective of teachers' experiences, their teaching styles and strategies, their feelings about the students, and their judgments in the classroom. Teaching diaries can help teachers to find the patterns in their classroom, make appropriate instructional decisions, adjust their teaching and reconsider their future roles while teaching. Numrich in 1996, for example, found interesting issues about early preoccupations of novice ESL teachers and the reasons why they chose some instructional methods through her diary study.

== Drawbacks ==
However, there are some drawbacks in the diary studies. Diary studies rely heavily on the diarist's willingness to keep the diary regularly and candidly. If the diarist only keeps the diary infrequently, the original entries collected may not be enough for analysis. The data may also be contaminated because the diarist doesn't want their thoughts and feeling to be published or they may make up their entries to cater to the researcher's needs. Furthermore, it is time consuming to collect and analyze all the entries. It takes a long time for a diarist to provide enough entries and the analyst needs to re-read the entries many times to find the regular patterns.
