= Leon Lucy =

American astrophysicist

Leon B. Lucy (1938–2018) was a British-American astrophysicist, best known for his contribution to the Richardson-Lucy deconvolution algorithm and spearheading the development of smoothed-particle hydrodynamics methods. He won the Gold Medal of the Royal Astronomical Society in 2000.
