= Xia Zhou =

American computer scientist

- 周霞
- Education: University of California, Santa Barbara; Peking University; Wuhan University
- Scientific career
- Fields: Computer Science
- Workplaces: Columbia University; Dartmouth College
- Doctoral advisor: Haitao Zheng

Xia Zhou is an associate professor in the Department of Computer Science at Columbia University. Her research centers on mobile computing and its intersection with other disciplines. Prior to Columbia, she was a tenured associate professor at Dartmouth College, where she used to co-direct the DartNets (Dartmouth Networking and Ubiquitous Systems) Lab and the Dartmouth Reality and Robotics Lab (RLab). She was a visiting faculty in National Taiwan University from December 2016 to February 2017, and in University of Cambridge from April 2017 to June 2017.

== Early life and education ==
Xia Zhou received her PhD in Computer Science at UC Santa Barbara in June 2013, working under the supervision of Haitao Zheng.

== Honors and awards ==
During her career she received several honors and awards:

- Presidential Early Career Award for Scientists and Engineers) Lab (2019)
- ACM SIGMOBILE Rockstar Award (2019)
- Susan and Gib Myers 1964 Faculty Fellowship (2018)
- Karen E. Wetterhahn Memorial Award for Distinguished Creative and Scholarly Achievement (2018)
- N2Women: Rising Stars in Networking and Communication (2017)
- Alfred P. Sloan Research Fellowship (2017)
- NSF CAREER Award (2016)
