= Richardson–Lucy deconvolution =

Procedure for recovering a blurred image

The use of Richardson–Lucy deconvolution to recover a signal blurred by an impulse response function

The Richardson–Lucy algorithm, also known as Lucy–Richardson deconvolution, is an iterative procedure for recovering an underlying image that has been blurred by a known point spread function. It was named after William Richardson and Leon B. Lucy, who described it independently.

== Description ==
Richardson–Lucy deconvolution of an image degraded by Gaussian blur and Poisson noise, showing the original, degraded image, and restorations after 30 and 100 iterations.

When an image is produced using an optical system and detected using photographic film, a charge-coupled device or a CMOS sensor, for example, it is inevitably blurred, with an ideal point source not appearing as a point but being spread out into what is known as the point spread function. Extended sources can be decomposed into the sum of many individual point sources, thus the observed image can be represented in terms of a transition matrix p operating on an underlying image:
$$d_i = \sum_j p_{i,j} u_j,$$
where $u_j$ is the intensity of the underlying image at pixel $j$, and $d_i$ is the detected intensity at pixel $i$. In general, a matrix whose elements are $p_{i,j}$ describes the portion of light from source pixel j that is detected in pixel i. In most good optical systems (or in general, linear systems that are described as shift-invariant) the transfer function p can be expressed simply in terms of the spatial offset between the source pixel j and the observation pixel i:
$$p_{i,j} = P(i - j),$$
where $P(\Delta i)$ is called a point spread function. In that case the above equation becomes a convolution. This has been written for one spatial dimension, but most imaging systems are two-dimensional, with the source, detected image, and point spread function all having two indices. So a two-dimensional detected image is a convolution of the underlying image with a two-dimensional point spread function $P(\Delta x,\Delta y)$ plus added detection noise.

In order to estimate $u_j$ given the observed $d_i$ and a known $P(\Delta i_x, \Delta j_y)$, the following iterative procedure is employed in which the estimate of $u_j$ (called $\hat{u}_j^{(t)}$) for iteration number t is updated as follows:
$$\hat{u}_j^{(t+1)} = \hat{u}_j^{(t)} \sum_i \frac{d_i}{c_i} p_{ij},$$
where
$$c_i = \sum_j p_{ij} \hat{u}_j^{(t)},$$
and $\sum_j p_{ij} = 1$ is assumed. It has been shown empirically that if this iteration converges, it converges to the maximum likelihood solution for $u_j$.

Writing this more generally for two (or more) dimensions in terms of convolution with a point spread function P:
$$\hat{u}^{(t+1)} = \hat{u}^{(t)} \cdot \left(\frac{d}{\hat{u}^{(t)} \otimes P} \otimes P^*\right),$$
where the division and multiplication are element-wise, $\otimes$ indicates a 2D convolution, and $P^*$ is the mirrored point spread function, or the inverse Fourier transform of the Hermitian transpose of the optical transfer function.

In problems where the point spread function $p_{ij}$ is not known a priori, a modification of the Richardson–Lucy algorithm has been proposed, in order to accomplish blind deconvolution.

== Derivation ==
In the context of fluorescence microscopy, the probability of measuring a set of number of photons (or digitalization counts proportional to detected light) $\mathbf{m} = [m_0, \dots, m_K]$ for expected values $\mathbf{E} = [E_0, \dots, E_K]$ for a detector with $K + 1$ pixels is given by
$$P(\mathbf{m} \mid \mathbf{E}) = \prod_i^K \operatorname{Poisson}(E_i) = \prod_i^K \frac{E_i^{m_i} e^{-E_i}}{m_i !}.$$
Since in the context of maximum-likelihood estimation the aim is to locate the maximum of the likelihood function without concern for its absolute value, it is convenient to work with $\ln(P)$:
$$\ln P(\mathbf{m} \mid \mathbf{E}) = \sum_i^K [(m_i \ln E_i - E_i) - \ln(m_i!)].$$
Moreover, since $\ln(m_i!)$ is a constant, it does not give any additional information regarding the position of the maximum, so consider
$$\alpha(\mathbf{m} \mid \mathbf{E}) = \sum_i^K [m_i \ln E_i - E_i],$$
where $\alpha$ is something that shares the same maximum position as $P(\mathbf{m} \mid \mathbf{E})$. Now consider that $\mathbf{E}$ comes from a ground truth $\mathbf{x}$ and a measurement $\mathbf{H}$ which is assumed to be linear. Then
$$\mathbf{E} = \mathbf{H} \mathbf{x},$$
where a matrix multiplication is implied. This can also be written in the form
$$E_m = \sum_n^K H_{mn} x_n,$$
where it can be seen how $H$ mixes or blurs the ground truth.

It can also be shown that the derivative of an element of $\mathbf{E}$, $(E_i)$ with respect to some other element of $x_j$ can be written as

$\frac{\partial E_i}{\partial x_j} = H_{ij}.$	1

It is easy to see this by writing a matrix $\mathbf{H}$ of, say, 5 × 5 and two arrays $\mathbf{E}$ and $\mathbf{x}$ of 5 elements and check it. This last equation can be interpreted as how much one element of $\mathbf{x}$, say element $i$, influences the other elements $j \neq i$ (and of course the case $i = j$ is also taken into account). For example, in a typical case an element of the ground truth $\mathbf{x}$ will influence nearby elements in $\mathbf{E}$ but not the very distant ones (a value of $0$ is expected on those matrix elements).

Now, the key and arbitrary step: $\mathbf{x}$ is not known but may be estimated by $\hat{\mathbf{x}}$. Let's call $\hat{\mathbf{x}}_\text{old}$ and $\hat{\mathbf{x}}_\text{new}$ the estimated ground truths while using the RL algorithm, where the hat symbol is used to distinguish ground truth from estimator of the ground truth

$\hat{\mathbf{x}}_\text{new} = \hat{\mathbf{x}}_\text{old} + \left.\lambda \frac{\partial\alpha(\mathbf{m} \mid \mathbf{E}(\mathbf{x}))}{\partial\mathbf{x}}\right|_{\hat{\mathbf{x}}_\text{old}},$	2

where $\frac{\partial}{\partial\mathbf{x}}$ stands for a $K$-dimensional gradient. Performing the partial derivative of $\alpha(\mathbf{m} \mid \mathbf{E}(\mathbf{x}))$ yields the following expression:
$$\frac{\partial\alpha(\mathbf{m} \mid \mathbf{E}(\mathbf{x}))}{\partial x_j} =
\frac{\partial}{\partial x_j} \sum_i^K [m_i \ln E_i - E_i] =
\sum_i^K \left[\frac{m_i}{E_i} \frac{\partial}{\partial x_j} E_i - \frac{\partial}{\partial x_j} E_i \right] =
\sum_i^K \frac{\partial E_i}{\partial x_j} \left[\frac{m_i}{E_i} - 1 \right].$$

By substituting (1), it follows that
$$\frac{\partial\alpha(\mathbf{m} \mid \mathbf{E}(\mathbf{x}))}{\partial x_j} =
\sum_i^K H_{ij} \left[\frac{m_i}{E_i}  - 1 \right].$$

Note that $H^T_{ji} = H_{ij}$ by the definition of a matrix transpose. And hence

$\frac{\partial\alpha(\mathbf{m} \mid \mathbf{E}(\mathbf{x}))}{\partial x_j} = \sum_i^K H^T_{ji} \left[\frac{m_i}{E_i} - 1 \right].$	3

Since this equation is true for all $j$ spanning all the elements from $1$ to $K$, these $K$ equations may be compactly rewritten as a single vectorial equation
$$\frac{\partial\alpha(\mathbf{m} \mid \mathbf{E}(\mathbf{x}))}{\partial \mathbf{x}} =
\mathbf{H}^T \left[\frac{\mathbf{m}}{\mathbf{E}} - \mathbf{1}\right],$$
where $\mathbf{H}^T$ is a matrix, and $\mathbf{m}$, $\mathbf{E}$ and $\mathbf{1}$ are vectors.

To ensure positive pixel values, we introduce the following scaling factor for the correction term

$\lambda = \frac{\hat{\mathbf{x}}_\text{old}}{\mathbf{H}^T \mathbf{1}},$	4

where $\mathbf{1}$ is a vector of ones of size $K$ (same as $\mathbf{m}$, $\mathbf{E}$ and $\mathbf{x}$), and the division is element-wise. By using (3) and (4), (2) may be rewritten as
$$\hat{\mathbf{x}}_\text{new} =
\hat{\mathbf{x}}_\text{old} + \lambda \frac{\partial\alpha(\mathbf{m} \mid \mathbf{E}(x))}{\partial x} =
\hat{\mathbf{x}}_\text{old} + \frac{\hat{\mathbf{x}}_\text{old}}{\mathbf{H}^T \mathbf{1}} \mathbf{H}^T \left[\frac{\mathbf{m}}{\mathbf{E}} - \mathbf{1}\right] =
\hat{\mathbf{x}}_\text{old} + \frac{\hat{\mathbf{x}}_\text{old}}{\mathbf{H}^T \mathbf{1}} \mathbf{H}^T \frac{\mathbf{m}}{\mathbf{E}} - \hat{\mathbf{x}}_\text{old},$$
which yields a multiplicative step method

$\hat{\mathbf{x}}_\text{new} = \hat{\mathbf{x}}_\text{old} \mathbf{H}^T \left(\frac{\mathbf{m}}{\mathbf{E}}\right) / \mathbf{H}^T \mathbf{1},$	5

where division refers to element-wise matrix division, and $\mathbf{H}^T$ operates as a matrix, but the division and the product (implicit after $\hat{\mathbf{x}}_\text{old}$) are element-wise. Also, $\mathbf{E} \equiv \mathbf{E}(\hat{\mathbf{x}}_\text{old}) = \mathbf{H} \hat{x}_\text{old}$ can be calculated because it is assumed that

- The initial guess $\hat{\mathbf{x}}_0$ is known.
- The measurement function $\mathbf{H}$ is known.

On the other hand, $\mathbf{m}$ is the experimental data. Therefore, equation (5) applied successively, provides an algorithm to estimate our ground truth $\mathbf{x}_\text{new}$ by ascending (since it moves in the direction of the gradient of the likelihood) in the likelihood landscape. It has not been demonstrated in the derivation above that it converges, and no dependence on the initial choice is shown. Note that equation (2) provides a way of following the direction that increases the likelihood, but the choice of the log-derivative is arbitrary. On the other hand, equation (4) introduces a way of weighting the movement from the previous step in the iteration. Note that if this term was not present in (5), then the algorithm would output a movement in the estimation even if $\mathbf{m} = \mathbf{E}(\hat{\mathbf{x}}_\text{old})$.

It is worth noting that no prior knowledge on the shape of the ground truth $\mathbf{x}$ is used in this derivation and that the only strategy used here is to maximize the likelihood at all cost, so artifacts on the image can be introduced.

== Software ==
- RawTherapee (since v.2.3)
- In the scikit-image the algorithm is implemented by the skimage.restoration.richardson_lucy function.

== See also ==
- Deconvolution
- Wiener filter (deconvolution in the presence of additive noise)
