= Cross-sequential study =

Research method

A cross-sequential design is a research method that combines both a longitudinal design and a cross-sectional design. It aims to correct for some of the problems inherent in the cross-sectional and longitudinal designs.

In a cross-sequential design (also called an "accelerated longitudinal" or "convergence" design), a researcher wants to study development over some large period of time within the lifespan. Rather than studying particular individuals across that whole period of time (e.g. 20–60 years) as in a longitudinal design, or multiple individuals of different ages at one time (e.g. 20, 25, 30, 35, 40, 45, 50, 55, and 60 years) as in a cross-sectional design, the researcher chooses a smaller time window (e.g. 20 years) to study multiple individuals of different starting ages. An example of a cross-sequential design is shown in the table below.

cohort	age		
A	20	25	30
B	25	30	35
C	30	35	40
D	35	40	45
E	40	45	50
F	45	50	55
G	50	55	60
year of measurement:	2000	2005	2010

In this table, over a span of 10 years, from 2000 to 2010, 7 overlapping cohorts with different starting ages could be studied to provide information on the whole span of development from ages 20 to 60.

This design has been used in studies to investigate career trajectories in academia and other phenomena.
