= ELight =

Scientific journal on optics

eLight
- Discipline: Optics
- Language: English
- Edited by: Aydoğan Özcan, Cheng-Wei Qiu, Xuejun Zhang

Publication details
- History: 2021—present
- Publisher: Springer, Light Publishing Group
- Frequency: Annually
- Open access: Yes
- Impact factor: 32.1 (2024)

Standard abbreviations
- ISO 4: eLight

Indexing
- CODEN: ELIGDE
- ISSN: 2097-1710 (print); 2662-8643 (web)

Links
- Journal homepage; Online access; Online archive

eLight is a peer-reviewed and open access scientific journal co-published by Springer Science+Business Media and Light Publishing Group. Established in 2021, it covers developments in optics and photonics. Its current editor-in-chiefs are Aydoğan Özcan (University of California, Los Angeles), Cheng-Wei Qiu (National University of Singapore) and Xuejun Zhang (Changchun Institute of Optics, Fine Mechanics and Physics).

== Abstracting and indexing ==
The journal is abstracted and indexed in:

- Current Contents/Engineering, Computing & Technology
- Current Contents/Physical, Chemical & Earth Sciences
- Directory of Open Access Journals
- Ei Compendex
- Inspec
- Science Citation Index Expanded
- Scopus

According to the Journal Citation Reports, the journal has a 2024 impact factor of 32.1.
