= Experience sampling method =

Longitudinal research methodology

The experience sampling method (ESM), also referred to as a daily diary method, or ecological momentary assessment (EMA), is an intensive longitudinal research methodology that involves asking participants to report on their thoughts, feelings, behaviors, and/or environment on multiple occasions over time. Participants report on their thoughts, feelings, behaviors, and/or environment in the moment (right then, not later; right there, not elsewhere) or shortly thereafter. Participants can be given a journal with many identical pages. Each page can have a psychometric scale, open-ended questions, or anything else used to assess their condition in that place and time. ESM studies can also operate fully automatized on portable electronic devices or via the internet. The experience sampling method was developed by Suzanne Prescott during doctoral work at University of Chicago's Committee on Human Development with assistance from her dissertation advisor Mihaly Csikszentmihalyi. Early studies that used ESM were coauthored by fellow students Reed W. Larson and Ronald Graef, whose dissertations both used the method.

== Overview ==
There are different ways to signal participants when to take notes in their journal or complete a questionnaire, like using preprogrammed stopwatches. An observer can have an identically programmed stopwatch, so the observer can record specific events as the participants are recording their feelings or other behaviors. It is best to avoid letting subjects know in advance when they will record their feelings, so they can't anticipate the event, and will just be "acting naturally" when they stop and take notes on their current condition. Conversely, some statistical techniques require roughly equidistant time intervals, which has the limitation that assessments can be anticipated. Validity in these studies comes from repetition, so you can look for patterns, like participants reporting greater happiness right after meals. For instance, Stieger and Reips were able to replicate and refine past research about the dynamics of well-being fluctuations during the day (low in the morning, high in the evening) and over the course of a week (low just before the beginning of the week, highest near the end of the week). These correlations can then be tested by other means for cause and effect, such as vector autoregression, since ESM just shows correlation. Moreover, by using the experience sampling method different research questions can be analyzed regarding the use of mobile devices in research. Following on from this, Stieger and colleagues used the experience sampling method to show that smartphones can be used to transfer computer-based tasks (CBTs) from the lab to the field.

Some authors also use the term experience sampling to encompass passive data derived from sources such as smartphones, wearable sensors, the Internet of Things, email and social media that do not require explicit input from participants. These methods can be advantageous as they impose less demand on participants improving compliance and allowing data to be collected for much longer periods, are less likely to change the behaviour being studied and allow data to be sampled at much higher rates and with greater precision. Many research questions can benefit from both active and passive forms of experience sampling.

== In clinical practice ==
Increasingly, ESM is being tested as a clinical monitoring tool in psychiatric and psychological treatments. Patients then use ESM to monitor themselves for several weeks or months and discuss feedback based on their ESM data with their clinician. Patients and clinicians are enthusiastic about the clinical use of ESM. Qualitative studies suggest ESM may increase insight and awareness, help personalize treatments, and improve communication between patient and clinician. ESM may be viewed as an improved form of registration and monitoring already often used in psychiatric treatments, and may therefore be an excellent fit. Randomized controlled trials so far show mixed evidence for the efficacy of ESM in improving symptoms and functioning in patients with depression, although many more trials in diverse clinical populations are currently underway.

Several tools are being developed to aid clinicians in using personalized ESM diaries in treatment such as PETRA, m-Path, and StudyRun. PETRA is a Dutch tool with which patients and clinicians can construct a personalized ESM diary and examine personalized feedback together. PETRA is developed in collaboration with patients and clinicians and integrated in electronic personal health records (PHR) to facilitate easy access. m-Path is a freely accessible flexible platform to facilitate real-time monitoring as well as real-life interventions. Practitioners are able to create new questionnaires and interventions from scratch or can use existing templates shared by the community. StudyRun is a commercial mobile sensing platform that supports experience sampling on iOS and Android through scheduled ESM surveys with branching logic, alongside photo, audio and cognitive tasks. It also supports micro-randomisation and rule-based triggers for just-in-time adaptive interventions, and combines survey responses with background smartphone sensor streams in a single exportable dataset.

== See also ==
- Ambulatory assessment
- Diary studies
- Event sampling methodology
- List of psychological research methods
- Quantified self
