= Sachin H. Jain =

American physician (born 1980)

- Born: 1980 (age 45–46); New York City, New York, U.S.
- Education: Harvard College; Harvard Medical School; Harvard Business School
- Occupation: Physician
- Known for: President & CEO of CareMore Health System; role in implementing HITECH Act and ACA
- Title: President, Chief Executive Officer, SCAN Group and Health Plan
- Board member of: America's Health Insurance Plans (AHIP), Omada Health, Advantage Healthcare Services, The Paul & Daisy Soros Fellowships for New Americans.

Sachin H. Jain (born 1980) is an American physician who held leadership positions in the Center for Medicare and Medicaid Services (CMS) and the Office of the National Coordinator for Health Information Technology (ONC).

From 2015 to 2020, he served as president and chief executive officer of the CareMore Health System.

In July 2020, he joined the SCAN Group and Health Plan as its new president and CEO. He is also adjunct professor of medicine at the Stanford University School of Medicine and a Contributor at Forbes.

== Early life and education ==
Born in New York City and raised in Alpine, New Jersey, Jain attended high school at the Academy for the Advancement of Science and Technology (now part of the Bergen County Academies). He received his undergraduate degree from Harvard College, and while at Harvard he opened a homeless health clinic with Cambridge Health Alliance. Jain received his medical degree (MD) from Harvard Medical School in 2006. He also earned a master's degree in business administration (MBA) from Harvard Business School.

== Early work ==
Jain completed his residency in internal medicine at Brigham and Women's Hospital and Harvard Medical School, but had been granted a two-year leave mid-residency to pursue government service. He is a founder of several nonprofit health care ventures including the Homeless Health Clinic at UniLu, the Harvard Bone Marrow Initiative, and the South Asian Healthcare Leadership Forum. He worked with DaVita-Bridge of Life to bring charity dialysis care to rural Rajasthan, India and Medical Missions for Children to bring cleft lip and palate surgery to the region through partnership with the International Human Benefit Services Trust.

While in residency, he was a researcher for Harvard Business School's Institute for Strategy and Competitiveness and worked with professors Michael Porter and Jim Yong Kim to build the emerging field of health care delivery science. He served as an expert consultant to the World Health Organization. He later partnered with the University of Pennsylvania's Amol Navathe and the publisher Elsevier to launch the field's charter journal, Healthcare: the Journal of Delivery Science and Innovation. He also collaborated with Brigham and Women's Hospital and Harvard Business School to create the John McArthur Program for Medicine Leadership.

== Career ==
In 2009, Jain joined the Office of the National Coordinator for Health Information Technology (ONC) as special assistant to David Blumenthal. Jain worked with Blumenthal to implement the HITECH Provisions of the Recovery Act. He also worked on increasing electronic health record usability and private sector engagement on behalf of ONC.

Jain was recruited by his college mentor Donald Berwick as a senior advisor to the administrator at the Centers for Medicare and Medicaid Services and was asked to help lead the launch of the Center for Medicare and Medicaid Innovation (CMMI) that was chartered by Section 3021 of the Patient Protection and Affordable Care Act. He served briefly as its deputy director for policy and programs under Richard Gilfillan, the center's first director. Jain advocated within the administrator's office for speedier translation of health care delivery research into practice; an enhanced diabetes prevention benefit; and an expanded use of clinical registries.

In 2012, Jain was appointed global Chief Medical Information and Innovation Officer of Merck. At Merck, Jain built and led the company's digital health and big data group. In 2015, Jain joined CareMore, an integrated health plan and delivery system. Jain left CareMore and joined SCAN Group and Health Plan, a $3.4b independent managed care company, as its president and CEO.

SCAN Group and Health Plan

In June 2020, Sachin Jain joined SCAN Group and Health Plan, originally known as the Senior Care Action Network. Upon his appointment, Jain announced a strategic focus on growth, diversification, innovation, and improving care for diverse and underserved populations.

CMS Lawsuit

In 2024, Sachin Jain initiated a lawsuit against the Centers for Medicare & Medicaid Services (CMS) in response to modifications made to the Medicare Advantage Star Ratings program. The legal action resulted in a favorable ruling for SCAN Health Plan, yielding approximately $250 million in additional revenue. These funds were subsequently used to enhance clinical benefits for SCAN members. The case had broader implications across the Medicare Advantage landscape, prompting CMS to recalculate $1.4 billion in payments affecting 60 health plans and approximately one million beneficiaries. The outcome of the lawsuit also encouraged other insurers to pursue similar legal challenges, some of which have since been successful.

== Writings ==
Jain has authored more than 100 publications on health care delivery innovation and health care reform.

His article, "Practicing Medicine in the Age of Facebook," in the New England Journal of Medicine explores the interface between social media and the practice of clinical medicine. Two of his articles in Journal of the American Medical Association, "Societal Perspectives on Physicians: Knights, Knaves, and Pawns?" (with Christine K. Cassel) and "Are Patients Knights, Knaves, and Pawn?" (with John Rother) build on the social theories of Julien LeGrand and apply them to physician and patient motivations. The book he co-edited with Susan Pories and Gordon Harper, "The Soul of a Doctor" has received mixed reviews.

His article, "The Racist Patient," was mentioned in the New York Times and generated controversy about the obligation of physicians to patients with racist attitudes towards them and critical comments directed at Jain's perspective.

== Honors ==
Jain is the subject of a Harvard Business School case study written by dean Nitin Nohria. Jain was selected to Boston Business Journal's 40 under 40 list. He has been named several times to Modern Healthcare's lists of most influential minority health leaders, most influential clinical executives, and most influential leaders in healthcare. In 2024, he was named one of American healthcare's most influential people in healthcare. In 2025 he was named to the Becker’s Hospital Review list of great leaders and the Los Angeles Business Journal added him to its annual LA 500 list.
