= Research design =

Overall strategy utilized to carry out research

Research design refers to the overall strategy utilized to answer research questions. A research design typically outlines the theories and models underlying a project; the research question(s) of a project; a strategy for gathering data and information; and a strategy for producing answers from the data. A strong research design yields valid answers to research questions while weak designs yield unreliable, imprecise or irrelevant answers.

Incorporated in the design of a research study will depend on the standpoint of the researcher over their beliefs in the nature of knowledge (see epistemology) and reality (see ontology), often shaped by the disciplinary areas the researcher belongs to.

The design of a study defines the study type (descriptive, correlational, semi-experimental, experimental, review, meta-analytic) and sub-type (e.g., descriptive-longitudinal case study), research problem, hypotheses, independent and dependent variables, experimental design, and, if applicable, data collection methods and a statistical analysis plan. A research design is a framework that has been created to find answers to research questions.

== Design types and sub-types ==
There are many ways to classify research designs. Nonetheless, the list below offers a number of useful distinctions between possible research designs. A research design is an arrangement or collection of conditions.

- Descriptive (e.g., case-study, naturalistic observation, survey)
- Correlational (e.g., case-control study, observational study)
- Experimental (e.g., field experiment, controlled experiment, quasi-experiment)
- Review (literature review, systematic review)
- Meta-analytic (meta-analysis)

Sometimes a distinction is made between "fixed" and "flexible" designs. In some cases, these types coincide with quantitative and qualitative research designs respectively, though this need not be the case. In fixed designs, the design of the study is fixed before the main stage of data collection takes place. Fixed designs are normally theory-driven; otherwise, it is impossible to know in advance which variables need to be controlled and measured. Often, these variables are measured quantitatively. Flexible designs allow for more freedom during the data collection process. One reason for using a flexible research design can be that the variable of interest is not quantitatively measurable, such as culture. In other cases, the theory might not be available before one starts the research.

=== Grouping ===
The choice of how to group participants depends on the research hypothesis and on how the participants are sampled. In a typical experimental study, there will be at least one "experimental" condition (e.g., "treatment") and one "control" condition ("no treatment"), but the appropriate method of grouping may depend on factors such as the duration of measurement phase and participant characteristics:

- Cohort study
- Cross-sectional study
- Cross-sequential study
- Longitudinal study

== Confirmatory versus exploratory research ==
Confirmatory research tests a priori hypotheses — outcome predictions that are made before the measurement phase begins. Such a priori hypotheses are usually derived from a theory or the results of previous studies. The advantage of confirmatory research is that the result is more meaningful, in the sense that it is much harder to claim that a certain result is generalizable beyond the data set. The reason for this is that in confirmatory research, one ideally strives to reduce the probability of falsely reporting a coincidental result as meaningful. This probability is known as α-level or the probability of a type I error.

Exploratory research, on the other hand, seeks to generate a posteriori hypotheses by examining a data-set and looking for potential relations between variables. It is also possible to have an idea about a relation between variables but to lack knowledge of the direction and strength of the relation. If the researcher does not have any specific hypotheses beforehand, the study is exploratory with respect to the variables in question (although it might be confirmatory for others). The advantage of exploratory research is that it is easier to make new discoveries due to the less stringent methodological restrictions. Here, the researcher does not want to miss a potentially interesting relation and therefore aims to minimize the probability of rejecting a real effect or relation; this probability is sometimes referred to as β and the associated error is of type II. In other words, if the researcher simply wants to see whether some measured variables could be related, he would want to increase the chances of finding a significant result by lowering the threshold of what is deemed to be significant.

Sometimes, a researcher may conduct exploratory research but report it as if it had been confirmatory ('Hypothesizing After the Results are Known', HARKing—see Hypotheses suggested by the data); this is a questionable research practice bordering on fraud.

== State problems versus process problems ==
A distinction can be made between state problems and process problems. State problems aim to answer what the state of a phenomenon is at a given time, while process problems deal with the change of phenomena over time. Examples of state problems are the level of mathematical skills of sixteen-year-old children, the computer skills of the elderly, the depression level of a person, etc. Examples of process problems are the development of mathematical skills from puberty to adulthood, the change in computer skills when people get older, and how depression symptoms change during therapy.

State problems are easier to measure than process problems. State problems just require one measurement of the phenomena of interest, while process problems always require multiple measurements. Research designs such as repeated measurements and longitudinal study are needed to address process problems.

== Examples of fixed designs ==
=== Experimental research designs ===
In an experimental design, the researcher actively tries to change the situation, circumstances, or experience of participants (manipulation), which may lead to a change in behavior or outcomes for the participants of the study. The researcher randomly assigns participants to different conditions, measures the variables of interest, and tries to control for confounding variables. Therefore, experiments are often highly fixed even before the data collection starts.

In a good experimental design, a few things are of great importance. First of all, it is necessary to think of the best way to operationalize the variables that will be measured, as well as which statistical methods would be most appropriate to answer the research question. Thus, the researcher should consider what the expectations of the study are as well as how to analyze any potential results. Finally, in an experimental design, the researcher must think of the practical limitations including the availability of participants as well as how representative the participants are to the target population. It is important to consider each of these factors before beginning the experiment. Additionally, many researchers employ power analysis before they conduct an experiment, in order to determine how large the sample must be to find an effect of a given size with a given design at the desired probability of making a Type I or Type II error. The researcher has the advantage of minimizing resources in experimental research designs.

=== Non-experimental research designs ===
Non-experimental research designs do not involve a manipulation of the situation, circumstances or experience of the participants. Non-experimental research designs can be broadly classified into three categories. First, in relational designs, a range of variables are measured. These designs are also called correlation studies because correlation data are most often used in the analysis. Since correlation does not imply causation, such studies simply identify co-movements of variables. Correlational designs are helpful in identifying the relation of one variable to another, and seeing the frequency of co-occurrence in two natural groups (see Correlation and dependence). The second type is comparative research. These designs compare two or more groups on one or more variable, such as the effect of gender on grades. The third type of non-experimental research is a longitudinal design. A longitudinal design examines variables such as performance exhibited by a group or groups over time (see Longitudinal study).

== Examples of flexible research designs ==
=== Case study ===
Famous case studies are for example the descriptions about the patients of Freud, who were thoroughly analysed and described.

Bell (1999) states "a case study approach is particularly appropriate for individual researchers because it gives an opportunity for one aspect of a problem to be studied in some depth within a limited time scale".

=== Grounded theory study ===
Grounded theory research is a systematic research process that works to develop "a process, and action or an interaction about a substantive topic".

== See also ==
- Bold hypothesis
- Clinical study design
- Design of experiments
- Grey box completion and validation
- Research proposal
- Royal Commission on Animal Magnetism
