= Mobile phone based sensing software =

Mobile phone–based sensing software is a class of software for mobile phones that uses the phone's sensors to acquire data about the user. Some applications of this software include mental health and overall wellness monitoring. This class of software is important because it has the potential of providing a practical and low-cost approach to deliver psychological interventions for the prevention of mental health disorders, as well as bringing such interventions to populations that have no access to traditional health care. A number of terms are used for this approach, including "personal sensing", "digital phenotyping", and "context sensing". The term "personal sensing" is used in this article, as it conveys in simple language the aim of sensing personal behaviors, states, and conditions.

== General information ==
This article presents a comparison of mobile phone software that can acquire users' sensor data (in a passive manner without users' explicit intervention) and administer questionnaires (or micro-surveys triggered by sensor events). The software described below helps quantify behaviors known to be related to mental health and wellness. The list below includes both commercial and free software. To be included in this list, a software product must be able to acquire data from at least one phone sensor, and provide a minimum level of security for storage and transmission of acquired data. This list excludes software that focuses solely on collecting participant data from surveys and questionnaires.

== Software table ==
The following table contains general information about each mobile-based sensing software, such as who the developers are, when it was last updated, whether it is open or closed source, and the programming language and database they are based on.

Name	Creator	Latest release	Latest release date	Software license	Open source	Programming language	Data backend
AWARE	Web dashboard and Android client: Denzil Ferreira (Community Instrumentation & Awareness, University of Oulu); Mac OSX and iOS clients: Yuuki Nishiyama (Tokuda Laboratory, SFC, Keio University)	4.0.836 (Android); 1.14.12 (iOS)	2023 (Android and iOS)	Apache License 2.0	Yes	Web dashboard: PHP, HTML, JavaScript; Android client: Java & Kotlin; Mac OSX and iOS clients: Objective-C & Swift	MySQL
Beiwe Research Platform	HSPH Onnela Lab	2.0.4 (iOS) 3.1.4 (Android)	Aug 31, 2021 iOS July 22, 2021 Android	BSD Licenses	Yes	Web dashboard: HTML, JavaScript; back-end and data analysis pipeline: Python, R, JavaScript; Android client: Java; iOS client: Swift, Objective-C	Amazon Web Services
CenceMe	Smartphone Sensing Group, Dartmouth College	1.2.0 (iOS)	July 27, 2009 (iOS)	Unknown	No	Python, Perl, PHP, Bash	MySQL
Context Sensing SDK	Intel	v1.0-beta2 (Windows Mobile); v1.8 (Android)	March 18, 2016 (Android)	Intel EULA	Intel Discontinued this product	Android: Java; Windows Mobile: C#	Flexible
EARS	Ksana Health	Android 2.038; iOS 2.1.5	August 2023	Apache License 2.0	Partial	Android: Java; iOS: Swift	Amazon Web Services
Empath	Department of Computer Science, University of Virginia	Unknown	2011	Unknown	No	Unknown	MySQL
Expimetrics	Louis Tay, Purdue University	Unknown	Unknown	Proprietary	No	Unknown	Unknown
Emotion Sense	Department of Psychology, University of Cambridge	Beta	April 25, 2017	BSD Licenses	Yes	Java	SQLite
Funf Open Sensing Framework	Originally at MIT Media Lab, now maintained by Behavio (Google)	v0.5.0RC1	September 4, 2015	LGPL	Yes	Java	SQLite
m-Path Sense	m-Path (KU Leuven)	2.8.0 (iOS and Android)	July 4, 2023	proprietary	No	App: Flutter (Dart), Dashboard: PHP, JavaScript	MySQL
mindLAMP Platform	Division of Digital Psychiatry @ Beth Israel Deaconess Medical Center	v2.0	May 2, 2023	BSD-3	style="background:#9EFF9E;color:black;vertical-align:middle;text-align:center;" class="table-yes skin-invert"|Yes	TypeScript, Python, R, Swift, Kotlin	Flexible (noSQL)
mEMA	Illumivu Inc	Unknown	Unknown	Proprietary	No	Unknown	Unknown
Metricwire	Metricwire Inc	Unknown	Unknown	Proprietary	No	Unknown	Unknown
Mobile Sensing Platform	Cogito Corporation	Unknown	Unknown	Proprietary	No	Unknown	Unknown
movisensXS	Movisens GmbH	1.1.1	January 5, 2017	Apache License 2.0	Partial	Java, Kotlin	Unknown
Murmuras	University of Bonn spin-off Murmuras (based on the Menthal project)	2.2.1	August 24, 2020	Proprietary	No	Android: Java, Kotlin; Web: Python, R, JavaScript	PostgreSQL
Passive Data Kit	Audacious Software	Coming soon	Summer 2017	Apache License 2.0	Yes	iOS: Objective-C, Android: Java, Web: JavaScript/Python/HTML	SQLite
Psychlog	Instituto Auxologico Italiano and National Research Council of Italy	Beta	April 11, 2013	License-free software	Yes	C#	MySQL
Psyt Research	Psychological Technologies (PSYT Ltd)	2.1	June 2017	Proprietary	No	Native iOS (Objective-C), native Android (Java), JavaScript	Hosted (backed by PostgreSQL)
Purple Robot	CBITS, Northwestern University	2.0.8	November 3, 2015	GPLv3	Yes	Java	PostgreSQL
Radar-CNS	King's College and Janssen Pharmaceutica NV	2.0.3-beta (dashboard); 0.1-alpha.2 (Android)	June 23, 2017 (dashboard); April 13, 2017 (Android)	Apache License 2.0	Yes	Android: Java, Web: TypeScript	MongoDB
RealLife exp	LifeData LLC	Unknown	Unknown	Proprietary	No	Unknown	Unknown
ResearchKit	Apple	1.5	June 7, 2017	BSD	Yes	Objective-C, Swift	Flexible, can use Sage Bridge to build own backend
Research Stack	Cornell Tech's Small Data Lab and open mHealth	1.1.1	November 18, 2016	Apache License 2.0	Yes	Java	SQLite, but can also use Sage Bridge to build own backend
SensingKit	Queen Mary University of London	0.5.1 (iOS), 0.2.0 (Android)	September 20, 2018 (iOS) July 29, 2015 (Android)	LGPL	Yes	Objective-C, Swift, Java	Depends on implementation
Socialise	Black Dog Institute	v0.2	June 16, 2017	Proprietary	No	iOS: Objective-C, Android: Java	Unknown
StudyRun	Selby Labs Pty Ltd	1.3 (Android and iOS)	2026 (Android and iOS)	Proprietary	No	Mobile clients: Kotlin (Kotlin Multiplatform) and Swift; Web dashboard: TypeScript; Back-end: Python	PostgreSQL (TimescaleDB)
unforgettable.me	Unforgettable Research Services	0.9.6 (Android)	December 5, 2017	Proprietary	No	Java, Python, JavaScript	Amazon Web Services

== Target audience ==
The following table shows the target audience for each piece of software included in this article. Software packages that target developers assume a high level of skill in creating code and/or modifying third-party source code. Software packages that target researchers have at least one component that can be used in scientific studies with human subjects. Software packages that target individuals allow at least one component to be downloaded and installed by an end-user with no programming skills. Please note that some packages target more than one type of user.

Target audience
Name	Developers	Researchers	Individuals
AWARE	Yes	Yes	Yes
Beiwe Research Platform	Yes	Yes	Yes
Cenceme	No	No	Yes
Context sensing SDK	Yes	No	No
EARS	No	Yes	Yes
Empath	No	Yes	No
Expimetrics	No	Yes	No
Emotion Sense	Yes	Yes	No
Funf	Yes	Yes	Yes
m-Path Sense	Yes	Yes	Yes
mindLAMP Platform	Yes	Yes	Yes
mEMA	No	Yes	No
Metricwire	No	Yes	No
Mobile Sensing Platform	No	Yes	No
MovisensXS	Yes	Yes	Yes
Murmuras	Yes	Yes	Yes
Passive Data Kit	Yes	Yes	Yes
Psychlog	Yes	Yes	Yes
Psyt	No	Yes	No
Purple Robot	Yes	Yes	Yes
Radar-CNS	No	Yes	No
RealLife Exp	No	Yes	No
ResearchKit	Yes	Yes	Yes
Research Stack	Yes	Yes	Yes
SensingKit	Yes	Yes	Yes
Socialise	Yes	Yes	Yes
StudyRun	No	Yes	No
unforgettable.me	Yes	Yes	Yes

== Mobile OS support ==
The following table shows the type of mobile phone on which each software package can be deployed.

Supported OS
Name	Android	iOS	Windows mobile	Nokia
AWARE	Yes	Yes	No	No
Beiwe Research Platform	Yes	Yes	No	No
Cenceme	No	Yes	No	Yes
Context sensing	Yes	No	Yes	No
EARS	Yes	Yes	No	No
Empath	No	Yes	No	No
Expimetrics	Yes	Yes	No	No
Emotion sense	Yes	No	No	No
Funf	Yes	No	No	No
m-Path Sense	Yes	Yes	No	No
mindLAMP Platform	Yes	Yes	No	No
mEMA	Yes	Yes	No	No
Metricwire	Yes	Yes	No	No
Mobile Sensing Platform	Yes	No	No	No
MovisensXS	Yes	No	No	No
Murmuras	Yes	No	No	No
Passive Data Kit	Yes	Yes	No	No
Psychlog	No	No	Yes	No
Psyt	Yes	Yes	No	No
Purple Robot	Yes	No	No	No
Radar-CNS	Yes	No	No	No
RealLife Exp	Yes	Yes	No	No
ResearchKit	No	Yes	No	No
Research Stack	Yes	No	No	No
SensingKit	Yes	Yes	No	No
Socialise	Yes	Yes	No	No
StudyRun	Yes	Yes	No	No
unforgettable.me	Yes	No	No	No

== Installation ==
In addition to deploying mobile-based sensing software to smart phones, a control dashboard has to be either installed on a local computer or provided through the web. Some of the packages provide a web server so that one is able to have a remote dashboard. The table below shows the server platform and/or web server required for each piece of software.

Installation requirements
Name	Server platform (operating system or web)	Web server required
AWARE	Web	Aware provides both a server hosted by them or the ability to host dashboard on own server
Beiwe Research Platform	Web	System back-end, web server, data storage on AWS
Cenceme	Web	Yes
Context sensing	Web / Windows / Mac	Depends on application
EARS	Web	Data storage on AWS
Empath	Web	Yes
Expimetrics	Unknown	Unknown
Emotion sense	Web	Depends on configuration
Funf	Web	Yes
m-Path Sense	Web	Not required. m-Path is hosted on KU Leuven servers
mindLAMP Platform	Web	Depends on application
mEMA	Web	Illumivu provides a web server for a fee
Metricwire	Web	Metricwire provides web server for a fee
Mobile Sensing Platform	Unknown	Unknown
MovisensXS	Web	Not required. Server hosted in ISO 27001 certified, German Data Center
Murmuras	Web	Not required. Own hardware servers colocated in Germany.
Psychlog	Unknown	Unknown
Psyt	Web	Not required. Server is hosted by Psyt
Purple Robot	Web	Yes
Radar-CNS	Frontend dashboard app	Yes
RealLife Exp	Web	LifeData provides a web server for a fee
ResearchKit	Web server	Yes
Research Stack	Web server	Yes
SensingKit	Web server	Depends on application
Socialise	Web server	Yes
StudyRun	Web	Hosted service via a dedicated AWS instance
unforgettable.me	Web	Web server on Amazon EC2, Data storage on Amazon S3, Cloudsearch

== Sensor (and other) data that can be captured (part 1) ==
The following table shows the types of mobile sensors from which each software package is capable of collecting sensor data. Note that the type of data collected depends on availability of the appropriate sensor hardware on a specific smartphone. Some software packages collect raw sensor data (e.g. Beiwe) whereas others collect summaries of such data (e.g. ResearchKit).

Supported sensors and data
Name	Accelerometer	Barometer	Battery	Bluetooth	ECG	Gravity	Gyroscope	Light	Magnetometer	Wifi
AWARE	Yes	Yes	Yes	Yes	No	Yes	Yes	Yes (Android only)	Yes	Yes
Beiwe Research Platform	Yes	No	Yes	Yes (Android only)	No	No	Yes (iOS only)	No	Yes (iOS only)	Yes
Cenceme	Yes	No	No	Yes	No	No	No	No	No	Yes
Context sensing	Yes	No	Yes	No	No	No	Yes	Yes, Windows mobile only	No	Yes
EARS	Yes	No	Yes	No	No	No	Yes	Yes (Android only)	No	Yes
Empath	External sensors									
Expimetrics	No	No	No	No	No	No	No	No	No	No
Emotion sense	Yes	No	Yes	Yes	No	No	Yes	Yes	Yes	Yes
Funf	Yes	No	Yes	Yes	No	Yes	Yes	Yes	Yes	Yes
m-Path Sense	Yes	Yes	Yes	Yes	No	Yes	Yes	Yes	Yes	Yes
mindLAMP Platform	Yes	Yes	Yes	Yes	No	Yes	Yes	Yes	Yes	Yes
mEMA	Yes	Yes	No	No	No	No	No	Yes	No	No
Metricwire	Unknown									
Mobile Sensing Platform	Yes	No	Yes	No	No	No	Yes	No	No	No
MovisensXS	Yes	No	Yes	Yes	Yes	No	No	Yes	No	Yes
Murmuras	not provided but possible	not provided but possible	not provided but possible	not provided but possible	No	No	not provided but possible	not provided but possible	not provided but possible	not provided but possible
Passive Data Kit	Yes	Unknown	Unknown	Unknown	Unknown	Unknown	Unknown	Yes	Unknown	Unknown
Psychlog	Yes	No	No	No	Yes	No	No	No	No	No
Psyt	Yes	Custom	Yes	Yes	Custom	No	Custom	Custom	Custom	No
Purple Robot	Yes	Yes	Yes	Yes	No	Yes	Yes	Yes	Yes	Yes
Radar-CNS	Yes	Unknown	Yes	Unknown	Unknown	Unknown	Unknown	Unknown	Unknown	Unknown
RealLife Exp	No	No	No	No	No	No	No	No	No	No
ResearchKit	Yes	Yes	not provided but possible	not provided but possible	No	not provided but possible	Yes	not provided but possible	Yes	not provided but possible
Research Stack	Mobile sensor input provided through SensingKit (below)									
SensingKit	Yes	Yes, iOS only	Yes	Yes, Android only	No	Yes	Yes	Yes, Android only	Yes	No
Socialise	Yes	No	Yes	Yes	No	No	No	No	No	No
StudyRun	Yes	Yes	Yes	Yes	No	Yes	Yes	Yes (Android only)	Yes	Yes

== Sensor and data that can be captured (part 2) ==
The following table shows the types of mobile sensors from which each software package is capable of collecting passive data. Note that the type of data collected depends on availability of the appropriate sensor on the smartphone.

Supported sensors and data
Name	Linear accelerometer	Location	Audio	Pressure sensor	Proximity	Rotation	Surveys	Temperature	Network reachability
AWARE	Yes	Yes	Yes	No	Yes (Android only)	Yes	Yes	Yes (Android only)	Yes
Beiwe Research Platform	No	Yes	Yes	No	Yes (iOS only)	No	Yes	No	Yes
Cenceme	No	Yes	Yes	No	No	No	No	No	No
Context sensing	No	Yes	Yes	No	Yes, Windows Mobile only	Yes	No	No	Yes
EARS	Yes	Yes	Yes	No	No	Yes	Yes	No	Yes
Empath	External sensors								
Expimetrics	No	Yes	Yes	No	No	No	Yes	No	No
Emotion sense	No	Yes	Yes	No	Yes	Yes	Yes	Yes	Yes
Funf	Yes	Yes	Yes	Yes	Yes	Yes	Yes	Yes	Yes
m-Path Sense	Yes	Yes	Yes	No	No	Yes	Yes	No	Yes
mindLAMP Platform	Yes	Yes	Yes	Yes	Yes	Yes	Yes	Yes	Yes
mEMA	No	Yes	Yes	No	Yes	Yes	Yes	No	No
Metricwire	Unknown	Yes	Unknown	Unknown	Unknown	Unknown	Yes	Unknown	Unknown
Mobile Sensing Platform	No	Yes	Yes	No	No	No	No	No	No
MovisensXS	Yes	Yes	Yes	No	No	No	Yes	No	Yes
Murmuras	not provided but possible	Yes	not provided but possible	No	not provided but possible	not provided but possible	Time and app usage triggered ESM/EMA	not provided but possible	not provided but possible
Passive Data Kit	Unknown	Unknown	Unknown	Unknown	Unknown	Unknown	Unknown	Unknown	Unknown
Psychlog	No	No	No	No	No	No	Yes	No	No
Psyt	Custom	Yes	Yes	Yes	Custom	No	Specialize in ESM and EMA surveys	No	Yes
Purple Robot	Yes	Yes	Yes	Yes	Yes	Yes	Yes	Yes	Yes
Radar-CNS	Unknown	Unknown	Unknown	Unknown	Unknown	Unknown	Unknown	Yes	Unknown
RealLife Exp	No	Yes	No	No	No	No	Yes	No	No
ResearchKit	not provided but possible	Yes	Yes	Yes	not provided but possible	Yes	Yes	not provided but possible	not provided but possible
Research Stack	Mobile sensor input provided through SensingKit (below)								
SensingKit	Yes	Yes	Yes	No	Yes, only on iOS	Yes	No	No	No
Socialise	No	Yes	No	No	Yes	No	Yes	No	No
StudyRun	Yes	Yes	Yes	Yes	Yes	Yes	Yes	Yes (Android only)	Yes

== Support for behavioral studies ==
The following table contains information regarding availability of functions, within each software package, that support behavioral experiments for scientific purposes.

Behavioral studies features
Name	How does data get from phone to database?	Can surveys be triggered by phone sensors?	Can surveys be triggered remotely by investigator?	Can sensor data config. be remotely changed?	Can platform monitor data gaps and alert investigator?	Does platform support running scripts on phone?
AWARE	Sensor data is uploaded to an AWARE Server instance (hosted or self-hosted) when online (WiFi only or any available connection)	Yes	Yes	Yes	Unknown	Unknown
Beiwe Research Platform	Wifi or cellular	No	Yes	Yes	Depends on implementation	No
Cenceme	Unknown	Unknown	Unknown	Unknown	Unknown	Unknown
Context sensing	Depends on implementation	Depends on implementation	Depends on implementation	Depends on implementation	Depends on implementation	Depends on implementation
EARS	Sensor data is uploaded to AWS when connected to Wifi or Mobile Data.	Yes	Yes	Yes	Yes	Unknown
Empath	Remote server connection	Unknown	Unknown	Unknown	Unknown	Unknown
Expimetrics	Unknown	Unknown	Unknown	Unknown	Unknown	Unknown
Emotion sense	Wifi	Yes, by using the trigger library	Depends on implementation	Depends on implementation	Depends on implementation	Depends on implementation
Funf	(1) manual export or Android file transfer service, (2) manual transfer from device's memory card, (3) setting up server and configure funf to upload data to server.	No	No	Yes	Depends on implementation	Depends on implementation
m-Path Sense	Sensor data is regularly uploaded to m-Path servers when Wi-Fi is available	No	Yes	Yes	Yes	No
mindLAMP Platform	WiFi and Cellular Data	Depends on implementation	Yes	Depends on implementation	Depends on implementation	Yes
mEMA	Unknown	Unknown	Unknown	Unknown	Unknown	Unknown
Metricwire	Unknown	Unknown	Unknown	Unknown	Unknown	Unknown
Mobile Sensing Platform	Unknown	Unknown	Unknown	Unknown	Unknown	Unknown
MovisensXS	Cell or Wifi. Online and Offline	Yes	No	Yes	Yes	No
Murmuras	WiFi or cellular.	Yes	Yes	Yes	Depends on implementation	Depends on implementation
Passive Data Kit	Unknown	Unknown	Unknown	Unknown	Unknown	Unknown
Psychlog	Unknown	No	No	No	No	No
Psyt	Hosted data store; automatic over-the-air background pload	Yes	In development	Yes	Yes	Yes
Purple Robot	Sensor data and user provided information is securely transmitted to custom data warehouses	Yes	Unknown	Yes	Unknown	Unknown
Radar-CNS	Unknown	Unknown	Unknown	Unknown	Unknown	Unknown
RealLife Exp	Unknown	Unknown	Unknown	Unknown	Unknown	Unknown
ResearchKit	Wi-fi or cellular	Depends on implementation	Depends on implementation	Depends on implementation	Depends on implementation	Depends on implementation
Research Stack	Wi-fi or cellular	Depends on implementation	Depends on implementation	Depends on implementation	Depends on implementation	Depends on implementation
SensingKit	Depends on implementation	Depends on implementation	Depends on implementation	Depends on implementation	Depends on implementation	Depends on implementation
Socialise	Wi-fi or cellular	No	Yes	No	Unknown	Unknown
StudyRun	Sensor data is buffered locally and uploaded in batches over Wifi or cellular to a hosted or self-hosted server	Yes, via a server-side sensor-triggered rule engine (JITAI)	Yes	Yes	Yes	No

== Battery management ==
The following table contains information relative to battery management for each software package. As passive data collection from smartphone sensors is a battery-intensive process, methods to maximize battery performance are important for this type of software.

Supported features
Name	Relative drain on battery	Methods of managing battery life
AWARE	Overall battery impact on average: 19.7mA when sensing only; 24.7mA when storing locally; and 138mA when connected to server	Built-in location algorithm that minimizes battery drain. Also uses event based sampling, opportunistic analysis and scheduled synching to reduce battery consumption
Beiwe Research Platform	Internal testing of Beiwe did not result in significant battery drain	Battery drain depends entirely on data collection settings
Cenceme	Unknown	Unknown
Context sensing	Unknown	Unknown
EARS	Rates of battery drainage are affected by which sensors are activated. The EARS Android app drains around 0.38% of the battery of a Samsung Galaxy 7 every hour of collection on all sensors. On newer devices or devices with fewer sensors, a smaller percentage is drained every hour.	Battery drain depends entirely on data collection settings
Empath	Unknown	Unknown
Expimetrics	Unknown	Unknown
Emotion sense	Unknown	To extend battery life, Emotionsense offloads computations to a remote server
Funf	Unknown	nonspecified type of "Battery optimization"
m-Path Sense	Battery impact depends on selected data to collect. Location data has high impact, gyroscope is low.	Battery drain can be optimized by being specific in data selection.
mindLAMP Platform	Minor battery drain, approximately 0.5% per hour depending on device and collection settings.	Battery drain depends entirely on data collection settings
mEMA	Unknown	Unknown
Metricwire	Unknown	Unknown
Mobile Sensing Platform	Unknown	Unknown
MovisensXS	Continues location tracking results in 4 days of battery life	Special algorithms maintain a low battery usage
Murmuras	Testing of Murmuras did not result in significant battery drain.	Battery drain depends entirely on data collection settings.
Passive Data Kit	Unknown	Unknown
Psychlog	5–6 hours of autonomy	None
Psyt	Varies with sensor implementation	No drain when backgrounded on iOS
Purple Robot	The battery drain (in seconds per %) of old uploader plugin was 211 seconds; after introducing a new uploader, the battery drain was 584 seconds	In 2014 purplerobot introduced optimizations that increased battery life 176%
Radar-CNS	Unknown	Unknown
RealLife Exp	Unknown	Unknown
ResearchKit	Depends on implementation	Depends on implementation
Research Stack	Depends on implementation	Depends on implementation
SensingKit	Battery performance was measured on an iPhone 5S running iOS 9.2 and the battery had the following duration performance: idle (51hrs), accelerometer (31hrs), gyroscope (28hrs), magnetometer (34hrs), device motion (21hrs), location (18hrs)	Unknown
Socialise	Battery performance was assessed on participants' own devices. Average battery life was 21.3 hours when app was not scanning and 18.8 hours when GPS, Bluetooth and battery data was collected every 5 minutes	Unknown
StudyRun	Battery drain depends on which sensors are enabled and their sampling settings	Per-sensor sampling configuration and batched data uploads; battery drain depends entirely on data collection settings

== Software maintenance and support ==
The following table contains information relative to maintenance and support for each software package. The information provided in this table gives an idea of the likelihood of a package to be supported in the future.

Software maintenance and support features
Name	Online documentation available	User's forum / technical support	How actively is software maintained?	User base	Support for bugs and updates	Location of source code (GitHub, SourceForge, Bitbucket, Launchpad)?	Funding source
AWARE	Yes	Slack, 503 users as of Oct 29, 2019	Android client: actively maintained (Denzil Ferreira); iOS client: actively maintained (Yuuki Nishiyama)	Used in 2722 studies across institutions worldwide.	Slack and GitHub Issue tracking actively used.	GitHub	Academy of Finland; Tekes; EU (Marie Curie Actions)
Beiwe Research Platform	Yes	Slack	6 iOS releases, 14 Android releases	Beiwe is currently used in 25 studies, primarily at various Harvard Medical School teaching hospitals	Yes	GitHub	NIH Director's New Innovator Award
Cenceme	No	No	Unknown	Unknown	Unknown	Unknown	Intel, Nokia, NSF, DHS
Context sensing SDK	Yes	Intel Context sensing SDK developer's forum at Intel.com	Unknown	Unknown	From May 18, 2016, to July 3, 2017, there were two issues posted the developers forum, one of then had 2 replies from intel and the other one had one reply from intel staff	Intel's Context Sensing SDK's download page	Intel
EARS	No	Unknown	Unknown	Unknown	Unknown	GitHub	Unknown
Emotion sense	Yes	Developers Forum at Google Groups	The sensor manager for Android had 0 commits from the week of July 10, 2016 to July 3, 2017. The Android sensor data manager had 0 commits from the week of July 10, 2016 to July 3, 2017. The iOS survey manager had 0 commits from the week of July 10, 2016 to July 3, 2017. The iOS sensor manager has 0 commits from the week of July 10, 2016 to July 3, 2017.	33 topics at their Google Group's developers forum. From July 3, 2016, to July 3, 2017, there were 5 topics opened, for a total of 11 posts. The forum seems to have gone silent since March 2017.	The developers forum seems to have gone silent since March 2017 and no issues have been raised in the GitHub page in the last year (July 3, 2016 to July 3, 2017).	GitHub	EPSRC (funding expired in 2015)
Empath	No	Unknown	Unknown	Unknown	Unknown	Unknown	NSF
Expimetrics	No	Unknown	Unknown	Unknown	Unknown	Unknown	Elevate Ventures
Funf	Yes	Developer's forum at Google Groups	Funf open sensing framework Android library and 0 commits from week of July 10, 2016 to July 3, 2017. The processing data scripts repository had 0 commits from week of July 10, 2016 to July 3, 2017.	The Funf developers google group has 338 members and a total of 229 topics, the large majority of which were started before the last year (July 3, 2016 to July 3, 2017).	A total of 60 issues were reported on the Funf open sensing framework at GitHub, 52 of which were resolved. No issues have been reported in the last year (July 3, 2016 to July 3, 2017).	GitHub	The Knight Foundation, Google
m-Path Sense	Yes	Reddit, /r/mpath actively maintained by developers	In constant development, monthly updates	38,000 App users worldwide	Reddit and e-mail support	Not publicly available	KU Leuven
mindLAMP Platform	Yes	Yes	Frequent updates, highly maintained.	Used by thousands of patients in studies around the world, including Harvard teaching hospitals. Over 100 cited publications.	Yes	GitHub	Public
mEMA	No	Unknown	Unknown	Unknown	Unknown	Unknown	Unknown
Metricwire	No	Unknown	Unknown	Unknown	Unknown	Unknown	Unknown
Mobile Sensing Platform	No	Unknown	Unknown	Unknown	Unknown	Unknown	DARPA
MovisensXS	Yes	Technical Support	Highly maintained. Every Android update is prepared. ~ Quarterly Updates.	~1700 Researchers. ~6000 Studies	Intercom 24/7 Chat support and Email.	Not available	Private
Murmuras	No	Technical Support	Frequent updates, highly maintained.	Unknown	Email and Phone support depending on contract.	Private	Commercial
Passive Data Kit	Coming soon	No users or developers forum	In the Passive data kit for Android there have been 64 commits from the week of July 10, 2016 to July 3, 2017. In the passive data kit for iOS there have been 19 commits from the week of July 10, 2016 to July 3, 2017. In the passive data kit online server there have been 75 commits from the week of July 10, 2016 to July 3, 2017	Unknown	Unknown	GitHub	Private
Psychlog	No	None	Not available	Not available	Not available	SourceForge	EU funding expired 2013
Psyt	No	Email support group	>1500 commits per year	Eight research projects, over 100,000 research participants	Fully supported under contract (for iOS and whitelisted Android devices)	Private	Commercial
Purple Robot	Yes	No users or developers forum available	There has been 0 commits from the week of July 10, 2016 to July 3, 2017.	Purple robot has been forked 20 times and it has 7 contributors and 35 branches	There are 44 issues open and 225 resolved. None of the reported issues has been within the last year (July 3, 2016 to July 3, 2017)	GitHub	Unknown
Radar-CNS	No	No users or developers forum available	The questionnaire mobile application code had 111 commits from the week of July 10, 2016 to July 3, 2017 (4 contributors). The dashboard source code had 290 commits from the week of July 10, 2016 to July 3, 2017 (4 contributors). The functionality for Android passive plugins had 372 commits from the week of July 10, 2016 to July 3, 2017 (6 contributors). The phone sensor plugin for passive remote monitoring app had 301 commits from the week of July 10, 2016 to July 3, 2017 (6 contributors). The android app source code had 139 commits from the week of July 10, 2016 to July 3, 2017 (5 contributors).	The repositories contained within Radar-CNS GitHub's account have been forked 20 times, which might be an indicator of the user/developer base	Questionnaire source code has a total of 13 open issues and 13 closed issues. The dashboard source code has a total of 25 open issues and 11 issues closed. The functionality for Android passive plugins has a total of 6 issues open and 3 closed. The phone sensor plugin has 0 total issues. The android app code has 13 issues open and 14 closed.	GitHub	Horizon 2020 and EFPIA
RealLife Exp	Yes	Help center	Not available	Not available	Not available	Not available	Private
ResearchKit	Yes	Developers Forum at Apple Developer Forums	200 commits from the week of July 10, 2016 to July 2, 2017 (96 contributors).	6 topics related to Researchkit within the developers forum, all of them opened within the last year (July 2016 to July 2017).	72 issues open and 362 closed (about a third of those issues occurred within the last year).	GitHub	Apple
Research Stack	Yes	Developers Forum at Google Groups	14 commits from the week of July 10, 2016 to July 2, 2017 (14 contributors)	32 topics in the developers forum, 11 of those topics updated within the last year (July 3, 2016 to July 2, 2017).	52 issues open and 78 closed. About a third of those issues occurred within the last year (July 2016 to July 2017).	GitHub	Robert Wood Johnson Foundation
SensingKit	Yes	No users or developers forum available	Sensingkit for iOS source code had 282 commits from the week of July 10, 2016 to July 2, 2017 (1 contributor).Sensingkit for Android had no commits from the week of July 10, 2016 to July 2, 2017 (1 contributor). Sensingkit server platform had no commits from the week of July 10, 2016 to July 2, 2017 (1 contributor)	15 forks total in Sensingkit for Android, iOS and server	There was a total of 3 issues open and 6 closed in iOS, Android and server repositories combines, all of the issues occurred within the last year (July 3, 2016 to July 2, 2017).	GitHub	UK Defence Science and Technology Laboratory
Socialise	No	No	Unknown	Unknown	Unknown	Private	National Health and Medical Research Council
StudyRun	Yes	Email technical support	Actively maintained; frequent updates	Unknown	Email support	Private	Commercial

== Security and privacy ==
The following table contains information relative to encryption and secure transfer of data collected from smartphone sensors. This information is very important for a data collection app due to privacy concerns over the handling of phone data.

Security and privacy
Name	Database encryption?	Secure data transfer?
AWARE	Locally protected by application signature and permission; enabled remotely by MySQL server deployment	SHA-256 with a 2048-bit long RSA strong encryption key or encrypted with any SSL certificate
Beiwe Research Platform	All data on phones, on the server, and in-transit use industry-standard encryption techniques. Data on phones and server are encrypted using 2048 bit RSA encryption and AES	SSL Encrypted connection
Cenceme	Unknown	Unknown
Context sensing	Not provided but can be accomplished using other APIs	Not provided but can be accomplished using other APIs
EARS	AES public-private key pairing on device + AWS encryption	TLS (1.2 or greater) Encrypted connection
Empath	Unknown	Unknown
Expimetrics	Unknown	Unknown
Emotion sense	Encryption is used but was unable to obtain more details	Encryption is used but was unable to obtain more details
Funf	RSA	Depends on type of transfer but data is encoded using RSA
m-Path Sense	KU Leuven standard data protection protocols are followed/>	TLS
mindLAMP Platform	AES public-private key pairing on device + AWS encryption	TLS (1.2 or greater) Encrypted connection
mEMA	Unknown	Unknown
Metricwire	Unknown	Unknown
Mobile Sensing Platform	AES, public-private key pairing	SSL encrypted connection
MovisensXS	AES, public-private key pairing	SSL encrypted connection
Murmuras	Locally protected by application signature and permission.	TLS/SSL with Certificate pinning
Passive Data Kit	Unknown	SSL
Psychlog	Unknown	Unknown
Psyt	On device (varies by platform) and back-end (Amazon Web Services RDS Postgres encrypted database)	Qualys A+ rated TLS
Purple Robot	Unknown	SSL
Radar-CNS	Encryption not provided yet	Encryption not provided yet
RealLife Exp	AES 256 bit encryption	Web app to server transmission: synchronous and asynchroonus SSL encryption; mobile app to server transmission: encoded using Base64 and encrypted using AES 256 bit encryption prior to transmission
ResearchKit	Not provided, thus it is the responsibility of the developer	Encrypted communication between app and server not provided
Research Stack	AES	Can use Sage Bridge
SensingKit	Not provided, thus it is the responsibility of the developer	Not provided, thus it is the responsibility of the developer
Socialise	Unknown	Unknown
StudyRun	Hosted deployments encrypted at rest (AES-256, AWS EBS/KMS); on-device buffer protected by application sandbox.	TLS (HTTPS) encrypted connection

== Cost ==
The following table contains information relative to whether a software package is free or non-free.

Cost of each platform and dependencies
Name	Cost
AWARE	Free
Beiwe Research Platform	Free
Cenceme	Unknown
Context sensing SDK	Free
EARS	Non-free
Empath	Unknown
Expimetrics	Non-free
Emotion sense	Free
Funf	Free
m-Path Sense	Non-free
mindLAMP Platform	By quote
mEMA	Non-free
Metricwire	By quote
Mobile Sensing Platform	Unknown
MovisensXS	Free for students
Murmuras	Free for students
Passive Data Kit	Free
Psychlog	Free
Psyt	Non-free
Purple Robot	Free
Radar-CNS	Free
RealLife Exp	Non-free
ResearchKit	Free
Research Stack	Free
SensingKit	Free
Socialise	Unknown
StudyRun	Free tier available

== See also ==
- MHealth
- Digital health
- Digital media use and mental health
- Quantifield self (QS)
- Ecological momentary assessment (EMA)
- Event sampling methodology (ESM)
- Diary studies
- Digital phenotyping
