= MMSE =

MMSE can refer to:

- Mini–mental state examination, a questionnaire to measure cognitive impairment
- Minimum mean square error, an estimation method that minimizes the mean square error
- Multimedia Messaging Service Environment, the servers in a mobile telephony network required for Multimedia Messaging Service messaging.
